= List of county executives of Maryland =

Current county executives of Maryland: Democratic (6) Republican (3) County does not have an executive

County executives head nine of the 23 counties of Maryland: Anne Arundel, Baltimore, Cecil, Frederick, Harford, Howard, Montgomery, Prince George's, and Wicomico. All of these counties have chartered governments and county councils; while Dorchester and Talbot counties also have chartered governments, they do not have executives. The other 12 counties are governed by boards of county commissioners. As of 2025, the Democratic Party held six county executiveships, while the Republican Party held three.

== Current executives ==
Current county executives of Maryland
County	Image	Executive	Entered office	Party	Election(s)	Ref.
Anne Arundel	Steuart Pittman speaking in 2020	Steuart Pittman (born 1961)	December 3, 2018	Democratic	2018 2022	
Baltimore	Kathy Klausmeier being sworn in, 2025	Kathy Klausmeier (born 1950)	January 7, 2025	Democratic	—N/a (Note: Klausmeier was selected by the Baltimore County Council to serve the rest of Johnny Olszewski's term after he was elected to the U.S. House of Representatives.)	
Cecil	Adam Streight in 2025	Adam Streight (born 1974)	December 2, 2024	Republican	2024	
Frederick	Jessica Fitzwater in 2023	Jessica Fitzwater (born 1983)	December 5, 2022	Democratic	2022 2026	
Harford	Robert Cassilly speaking in 2023	Robert Cassilly (born 1958)	December 5, 2022	Republican	2022	
Howard		Brandee Ganz; Acting	November 16, 2026	Democratic	—N/a (Note: Ganz became acting executive after the resignation of Ball.)	
Montgomery	Marc Elrich speaking in 2014	Marc Elrich (born 1949)	December 3, 2018	Democratic	2018 2022	
Prince George's	Aisha Braveboy smiling in 2024	Aisha Braveboy (born 1974)	June 18, 2025	Democratic	2025 (special) 2026	
Wicomico	Julie Giodano smiling in 2023	Julie Giordano (born 1981)	December 6, 2022	Republican	2022	

== County executives-elect ==
County	Image	Executive-elect	Entering office	Party	Election(s)	Ref.
Anne Arundel	Allison Pickard smiling in 2023	Allison Pickard (born 1972)	December 7, 2026	Democratic	2026	
Baltimore	Julian Jones smiling in 2026	Julian Jones (born 1962/1963)	December 5, 2026	Democratic	2026	
Howard	Vanessa Atterbeary smiling in 2023	Vanessa Atterbeary (born 1975)	December 7, 2026	Democratic	2026	
Montgomery	Will Jawando smiling in 2025	Will Jawando (born 1983)	December 7, 2026	Democratic	2026	
Wicomico	Ernest Davis looking right in 2016	Ernest Davis	December 1, 2026	Democratic	2026	

== Executives by county ==
=== Anne Arundel ===
Executives of Anne Arundel County
Image	Executive	Tenure	Party	Election(s)	Ref.
—N/a	Joseph W. Alton (1919–2013)	February 1, 1965 – December 2, 1974	Republican	1965 1970	
—N/a	Robert A. Pascal (1934–2021)	December 2, 1974 – 1982	Republican	1974 1978	
O. James Lighthizer smiling at an event	O. James Lighthizer (born 1946)	1982 – 1990	Democratic	1982 1986	
Robert R. Neall smiling in 2018	Robert R. Neall (born 1948)	1990 – 1994	Republican	1990	
—N/a	John G. Gary (1943–2025)	1994 – 1998	Republican	1994	
—N/a	Janet S. Owens (born 1944)	1998 – 2006	Democratic	1998 2002	
John Leopold speaking in 2020	John R. Leopold (born 1943)	December 4, 2006 – February 1, 2013 (Note: Leopold was suspended from January 29 after he was convicted on two counts of misconduct in office; he resigned on February 1.)	Republican	2006 2010	
—N/a	John R. Hammond Acting	February 2013	Republican	—N/a	
Laura Neuman smiling at an event in 2014	Laura Neuman (born 1965)	February 22, 2013 – December 1, 2014	Republican	—N/a (Note: Neuman was selected by the Anne Arundel County Council to serve the rest of Leopold's term.)	
Steve Schuh smiling at an event	Steve Schuh (born 1960)	December 1, 2014 – December 3, 2018	Republican	2014	
Steuart Pittman speaking in 2024	Steuart Pittman (born 1961)	December 3, 2018 – present	Democratic	2018 2022	

=== Cecil ===
Executives of Cecil County
Image	Executive	Tenure	Party	Election(s)	Ref.
Tari Moore smiling in 2016	Tari Moore	December 3, 2012 – December 5, 2016	Independent (Note: While Moore won election as a Republican, she became an independent on November 29, 2012, before entering office. She rejoined the Republicans on November 11, 2013.)	2012	
Tari Moore smiling in 2016	Tari Moore	December 3, 2012 – December 5, 2016	Republican	2012	
Alan McCarthy smiling in 2018	Alan McCarthy (born 1947)	December 5, 2016 – December 7, 2020	Republican	2016	
Danielle Hornberger facing left smiling in 2023	Danielle Hornberger (born 1981)	December 7, 2020 – December 2, 2024	Republican	2020	
Adam Streight in 2025	Adam Streight (born 1974)	December 2, 2024 – present	Republican	2024	

=== Frederick ===
Executives of Frederick County
Image	Executive	Tenure	Party	Election(s)	Ref.
Jan Gardner smiling in 2018	Jan Gardner (born 1956)	December 1, 2014 – December 5, 2022	Democratic	2014 2018	
Jessica Fitzwater in 2023	Jessica Fitzwater (born 1983)	December 5, 2022 – present	Democratic	2022 2026	

=== Harford ===
Executives of Harford County
Image	Executive	Tenure	Party	Election(s)	Ref.
—N/a	Charles Anderson (born 1931)	December 28, 1972 – December 4, 1978	Democratic	1972 1974	
—N/a	J. Thomas Barranger (1947–2011)	December 4, 1978 – December 6, 1982	Democratic	1978	
—N/a	Habern W. Freeman (born 1941)	December 6, 1982 – December 3, 1990	Democratic	1982 1986	
Eileen Rehrmann smiling in 2026	Eileen M. Rehrmann (born 1944)	December 3, 1990 – December 7, 1998	Democratic	1990 1994	
James M. Harkins in 2013	James M. Harkins (born 1953)	December 7, 1998 – June 30, 2005	Republican	1998 2002	
David R. Craig smiling on a blue background	David R. Craig (born 1949)	July 4, 2005 – December 1, 2014	Republican	2006 (Note: Craig became executive after Harkins resigned; he was elected to a full term in 2006.) 2010	
Barry Glassman smiling in 2021	Barry Glassman (born 1962)	December 1, 2014 – December 5, 2022	Republican	2014 2018	
Robert Cassilly speaking in 2023	Robert Cassilly (born 1958)	December 5, 2022 – present	Republican	2022	

=== Howard ===
Executives of Howard County
Image	Executive	Tenure	Party	Election(s)	Ref.
—N/a	Omar Jones (1913–1976)	January 28, 1969 – 1974	Democratic		
Black-and-white image of Edward L. Cochran smiling in a laboratory, circa 1958	Edward L. Cochran (1929–2025)	December 1974 – December 1978	Democratic	1974	
—N/a	J. Hugh Nichols (1930–2015)	December 1978 – July 1986	Democratic	1978 1982	
—N/a	J. Hugh Nichols (1930–2015)	December 1978 – July 1986	Republican (Note: Nichols left the Democrats for the Republicans in 1986.)	1978 1982	
—N/a	Ned Eakle (1926–2012) Acting	October 22, 1986 – December 1986	Democratic	—N/a (Note: Eakle became acting executive after the resignation of Nichols.)	
Elizabeth Bobo smiling in 2007	Elizabeth Bobo (born 1943)	December 1, 1986 – December 3, 1990	Democratic	1986	
—N/a	Chuck Ecker (1928–2015)	December 3, 1990 – December 1998	Republican	1990 1994	
James N. Robey with his mouth open in 2011	James N. Robey (born 1941)	December 1998 – December 4, 2006	Democratic	1998 2002	
Kenneth Ulman smiling in 2023	Kenneth Ulman (born 1974)	December 4, 2006 – December 1, 2014	Democratic	2006 2010	
Allan H. Kittleman speaking in 2015	Allan H. Kittleman (born 1958)	December 1, 2014 – December 3, 2018	Republican	2014	
Calvin Ball smiling on a yellow background, 2023	Calvin Ball III (born 1975)	December 3, 2018 – November 16, 2026	Democratic	2018 2022	
	Brandee Ganz Acting	November 16, 2026 – present	Democratic	—N/a (Note: Ganz became acting executive after the resignation of Ball.)	

=== Montgomery ===
Executives of Montgomery County
Image	Executive	Tenure	Party	Election(s)	Ref.
—N/a	James P. Gleason (1921–2008)	December 7, 1970 – December 4, 1978	Republican	1970 1974	
—N/a	Charles W. Gilchrist (1936–1999)	December 4, 1978 – December 1, 1986	Democratic	1978 1982	
Sidney Kramer in 2016	Sidney Kramer (1925–2022)	December 1, 1986 – December 3, 1990	Democratic	1986	
—N/a	Neal Potter (1915–2008)	December 3, 1990 – December 5, 1994	Democratic	1990	
Doug Duncan laughing at an event, 2014	Doug Duncan (born 1955)	December 5, 1994 – December 4, 2006	Democratic	1994 1998 2002	
Leggett in 2017	Ike Leggett (born 1944)	December 4, 2006 – December 3, 2018	Democratic	2006 2010 2014	
Marc Elrich speaking in 2014	Marc Elrich (born 1949)	December 3, 2018 – present	Democratic	2018 2022	

=== Prince George's ===
Executives of Prince George's County
Image	Executive	Tenure	Party	Election(s)	Ref.
—N/a	William W. Gullett (1922–2015)	February 8, 1971 – 1974	Republican	1971	
—N/a	Winfield M. Kelly Jr. (1935–2023)	1974 – 1978	Democratic	1974	
Lawrence Hogan in 1969	Lawrence Hogan (1928–2017)	December 1978 – December 19, 1982	Republican	1978	
Parris Glendening smiling in 2023	Parris Glendening (born 1942)	December 19, 1982 – December 1994	Democratic	1982 1986 1990	
—N/a	Wayne Curry (1951–2014)	December 1994 – December 2, 2002	Democratic	1994 1998	
—N/a	Jack B. Johnson (born 1949)	December 2, 2002 – December 6, 2010	Democratic	2002 2006	
Rushern Baker speaking in May 2017	Rushern Baker (born 1958)	December 6, 2010 – December 3, 2018	Democratic	2010 2014	
Angela Alsobrooks in 2024	Angela Alsobrooks (born 1971)	December 3, 2018 – December 2, 2024	Democratic	2018 2022	
Tara Jackson smiling in 2025	Tara Jackson Acting	December 2, 2024 – June 18, 2025	Democratic	—N/a (Note: Jackson became acting executive after Angela Alsobrooks was elected to the U.S. Senate.)	
Aisha Braveboy smiling in 2024	Aisha Braveboy (born 1974)	June 18, 2025 – present	Democratic	2025	

=== Wicomico ===
Executives of Wicomico County
Image	Executive	Tenure	Party	Election(s)	Ref.
Richard Pollitt speaking in 2013	Richard M. Pollitt Jr. (born 1952)	December 5, 2006 – December 2, 2014	Democratic	2006 2010	
Richard Pollitt speaking in 2013	Bob Culver (1952–2020)	December 2, 2014 – July 26, 2020	Republican	2014 2018	
John Psota speaking in 2013	John Psota (born 1963)	July 26, 2020 – December 6, 2022	Republican	—N/a (Note: Psota became acting executive after the death of Culver and was later chosen by the Wicomico County Council to serve the remainder of Culver's term. He ran for a full term in 2022, but was defeated in the Republican primary by Julie Giordano.)	
Julie Giordano smiling in 2023	Julie Giordano (born 1981)	December 6, 2022 – present	Republican	2022	

== See also ==
- List of mayors of Baltimore – the head of the independent city of Baltimore
