= 1974 Maryland county executive elections =

- November 5, 1974

All 6 of Maryland's county executive seats
	Majority party	Minority party
Party	Democratic	Republican
Last election	3	3
Seats won	4	2
Seat change	▲1	▼1
Democratic
50–60%
Republican
50-60%
60-70%

The Maryland county executive elections of 1974 took place on November 5, 1974. Anne Arundel County, Baltimore County, Harford County, Howard County, Montgomery County, and Prince George's County elected county executives.

== Anne Arundel County ==
=== Republican primary ===
==== Candidates ====
===== Nominee =====
- Robert A. Pascal, state senator

==== Results ====
Republican primary results
Party	Candidate	Votes	%
Republican	Robert A. Pascal	Unopposed	

=== Democratic primary ===
==== Candidates ====
===== Nominee =====
- John H. Downs, county councilmember

===== Eliminated in primary =====
- Richard N. Hambleton, attorney and perennial candidate

==== Results ====
Democratic primary results
Party	Candidate	Votes	%
Democratic	John H. Downs	14,253	61.7%
Democratic	Richard N. Hambleton	8,856	38.3%

=== General election ===
==== Results ====
Anne Arundel County Executive election, 1974
Party	Candidate	Votes	%
Republican	Robert A. Pascal	49,566	69.5%
Democratic	John H. Downs	21,706	30.5%
Republican hold			

== Baltimore County ==
=== Democratic primary ===
==== Candidates ====
===== Nominee =====
- Ted Venetoulis, political strategist and author

===== Eliminated in primary =====
- Louis Ambrosetti, business owner
- Francis C. Barrett, county councilmember
- Frederick L. Dewberry, incumbent county executive
- William F. Harrison, insurance executive
- George P. Mahoney, perennial candidate and nominee for governor in 1966
- Joseph J. Weir, beauty parlor operator

==== Results ====
Democratic primary results
Party	Candidate	Votes	%
Democratic	Ted Venetoulis	44,460	44.9%
Democratic	Frederick L. Dewberry (incumbent)	28,068	28.3%
Democratic	George P. Mahoney	18,335	18.5%
Democratic	Francis C. Barrett	4,933	5.0%
Democratic	Louis Ambrosetti	1,301	1.3%
Democratic	Joseph J. Weir	1,002	1.0%
Democratic	William F. Harrison	930	0.9%

=== Republican primary ===
==== Candidates ====
===== Nominee =====
- Jervis S. Finney, state senator

===== Eliminated in primary =====
- Joseph U. Kauffman Jr.

==== Results ====
Republican primary results
Party	Candidate	Votes	%
Republican	Jervis S. Finney	13,212	86.1%
Republican	Joseph U. Kauffman Jr.	2,132	13.9%

=== General election ===
==== Results ====
Baltimore County Executive election, 1974
Party	Candidate	Votes	%
Democratic	Ted Venetoulis	94,801	51.9%
Republican	Jerves S. Finney	88,027	48.1%
Democratic hold			

== Harford County ==
=== Democratic primary ===
==== Candidates ====
===== Nominee =====
- Charles Anderson, incumbent county executive

===== Eliminated in primary =====
- Monroe Duke, management expert

==== Results ====
Democratic primary results
Party	Candidate	Votes	%
Democratic	Charles Anderson (incumbent)	7,187	52.7%
Democratic	Monroe I. Duke	6,453	47.3%

=== Republican primary ===
==== Candidates ====
===== Nominee =====
- John H. O'Neill, president of the Harford County Council

===== Eliminated in primary =====
- Michael C. Johns, pharmaceutical salesman

==== Results ====
Republican primary results
Party	Candidate	Votes	%
Republican	John H. O'Neill	2,669	77.3%
Republican	Michael C. Johns	786	22.7%

=== General election ===
==== Results ====
Harford County Executive election, 1974
Party	Candidate	Votes	%
Democratic	Charles Anderson (incumbent)	16,303	55.1%
Republican	John H. O'Neill	13,285	44.9%
Democratic hold			

== Howard County ==
=== Democratic primary ===
==== Candidates ====
===== Nominee =====
- Edward L. Cochran, county councilmember

==== Results ====
Democratic primary results
Party	Candidate	Votes	%
Democratic	Edward L. Cochran	Unopposed	

=== Republican primary ===
==== Candidates ====
===== Nominee =====
- Howard G. Crist, businessman

===== Eliminated in primary =====
- Georgia L. Baublitz, member of the Howard County personnel board
- Herschell C. Doss, perennial candidate
- Robert E. Watson, newspaper editor

==== Results ====
Republican primary results
Party	Candidate	Votes	%
Republican	Howard G. Crist	1,323	34.1%
Republican	Robert E. Watson	1,089	28.0%
Republican	Herschell C. Doss	944	24.3%
Republican	G. L. Baublitz	528	13.6%

=== General election ===
==== Results ====
Howard County Executive election, 1974
Party	Candidate	Votes	%
Democratic	Edward L. Cochran	12,821	53.3%
Republican	Howard G. Crist	11,235	46.7%
Republican hold			

== Montgomery County ==
=== Republican primary ===
==== Candidates ====
===== Nominee =====
- James P. Gleason, incumbent county executive

==== Results ====
Republican primary results
Party	Candidate	Votes	%
Republican	James P. Gleason	Unopposed	

=== Democratic primary ===
==== Candidates ====
===== Nominee =====
- Idamae Garrott, county councilmember

===== Eliminated in primary =====
- John P. Hewitt, executive director of the Maryland-National Capital Park and Planning Commission
- William E. Sher, county councilmember

==== Results ====
Democratic primary results
Party	Candidate	Votes	%
Democratic	Idamae Garrott	28,689	50.0%
Democratic	William E. Sher	14,787	25.8%
Democratic	John P. Hewitt	13,908	24.2%

=== General election ===
==== Results ====
Montgomery County Executive election, 1974
Party	Candidate	Votes	%
Republican	James P. Gleason (incumbent)	84,919	53.0%
Democratic	Idamae Garrott	75,163	47.0%
Republican hold			

== Prince George's County ==
=== Republican primary ===
==== Candidates ====
===== Nominee =====
- William W. Gullett, incumbent county executive

==== Results ====
Republican primary results
Party	Candidate	Votes	%
Republican	William W. Gullett	Unopposed	

=== Democratic primary ===
==== Candidates ====
===== Nominee =====
- Winfield M. Kelly Jr., county councilmember

==== Results ====
Democratic primary results
Party	Candidate	Votes	%
Democratic	Winfield M. Kelly Jr.	Unopposed	

=== General election ===
==== Results ====
Prince George's County Executive election, 1974
Party	Candidate	Votes	%
Democratic	Winfield M. Kelly Jr.	61,980	53.5%
Republican	William W. Gullett (incumbent)	53,881	46.5%
Democratic gain from Republican			
