= 1994 Maryland county executive elections =

- November 8, 1994

All 6 of Maryland's county executive seats
	Majority party	Minority party
Party	Democratic	Republican
Last election	3	3
Seats won	4	2
Seat change	▲1	▼1
Democratic
50–60%
60–70%
Republican
50-60%
60-70%

The Maryland county executive elections of 1994 took place on November 8, 1994. Anne Arundel County, Baltimore County, Harford County, Howard County, Montgomery County, and Prince George's County elected county executives.

== Anne Arundel County ==
=== Republican primary ===
==== Candidates ====
===== Nominee =====
- John G. Gary, state delegate

===== Declined =====
- Robert R. Neall, incumbent county executive

==== Results ====
Republican primary results
Party	Candidate	Votes	%
Republican	John G. Gary	Unopposed	

=== Democratic primary ===
==== Candidates ====
===== Nominee =====
- Theodore J. Sophocleus, state delegate and nominee for county executive in 1990

===== Eliminated in primary =====
- Robert Agee, former aide to county executive O. James Lighthizer
- Louise Beauregard, perennial candidate
- H. Erle Schafer, former state senator
- Larry E. Walker, police corporal

==== Results ====
Democratic primary results
Party	Candidate	Votes	%
Democratic	Theodore J. Sophocleus	20,913	48.8%
Democratic	Robert Agee	12,465	29.1%
Democratic	H. Erie Schafer	4,659	10.9%
Democratic	Larry E. Walker	3,120	7.3%
Democratic	Louise Beauregard	1,678	3.9%

=== General election ===
==== Results ====
Anne Arundel County Executive election, 1994
Party	Candidate	Votes	%
Republican	John G. Gary	69,632	52.6%
Democratic	Theodore J. Sophocleus	62,637	47.4%
Republican hold			

== Baltimore County ==
=== Republican primary ===
==== Candidates ====
===== Nominee =====
- Roger B. Hayden, incumbent county executive

===== Eliminated in primary =====
- Donald W. Brewer, former county ride-share coordinator
- George Egbert, former police officer

==== Results ====
Republican primary results
Party	Candidate	Votes	%
Republican	Roger B. Hayden	22,017	68.9%
Republican	Donald W. Brewer	8,033	25.1%
Republican	George Egbert	1,917	6.0%

=== Democratic primary ===
==== Candidates ====
===== Nominee =====
- Dutch Ruppersberger, county councilmember

===== Eliminated in primary =====
- John C. Coolahan, associate judge of the Baltimore County Circuit Court
- Melvin G. Mintz, county councilmember
- Kevin Pearl, LaRouche movement activist

===== Withdrawn =====
- Nancy L. Murphy, state senator (ran for re-election)

==== Results ====
Democratic primary results
Party	Candidate	Votes	%
Democratic	Dutch Ruppersberger	48,487	53.3%
Democratic	Melvin G. Mintz	28,181	31.0%
Democratic	John C. Coolahan	12,642	13.9%
Democratic	Kevin Pearl	1,711	1.9%

=== General election ===
==== Results ====
Baltimore County Executive election, 1994
Party	Candidate	Votes	%
Democratic	Dutch Ruppersberger	119,555	54.1%
Republican	Roger B. Hayden (incumbent)	101,598	45.9%
Democratic gain from Republican			

== Harford County ==
=== Democratic primary ===
==== Candidates ====
===== Nominee =====
- Eileen M. Rehrmann, incumbent county executive

==== Results ====
Democratic primary results
Party	Candidate	Votes	%
Democratic	Eileen M. Rehrmann (incumbent)	Unopposed	

=== Republican primary ===
==== Candidates ====
===== Nominee =====
- Ronald Szczybor, financial advisor and business owner

==== Results ====
Republican primary results
Party	Candidate	Votes	%
Republican	Ronald Szczybor	Unopposed	

=== General election ===
==== Results ====
Harford County Executive election, 1994
Party	Candidate	Votes	%
Democratic	Eileen M. Rehrmann (incumbent)	38,623	62.3%
Republican	Ronald M. Szczybor	23,418	37.7%
Democratic hold			

== Howard County ==
=== Republican primary ===
==== Candidates ====
===== Nominee =====
- Chuck Ecker, incumbent county executive

==== Results ====
Republican primary results
Party	Candidate	Votes	%
Republican	Chuck Ecker (incumbent)	Unopposed	

=== Democratic primary ===
==== Candidates ====
===== Nominee =====
- Susan Gray, lawyer and community activist

===== Eliminated in primary =====
- Sue-Ellen Hantman, former chair of the Howard County Democratic Central Committee

==== Results ====
Democratic primary results
Party	Candidate	Votes	%
Democratic	Susan Gray	10,084	52.7%
Democratic	Sue-Ellen Hantman	9,037	47.3%

=== General election ===
==== Results ====
Howard County Executive election, 1994
Party	Candidate	Votes	%
Republican	Chuck Ecker (incumbent)	44,749	64.4%
Democratic	Susan Gray	24,765	35.6%
Republican hold			

== Montgomery County ==
=== Democratic primary ===
==== Candidates ====
===== Nominee =====
- Douglas Duncan, former mayor of Rockville

===== Eliminated in primary =====
- Bruce Adams, county councilmember
- Gus Bauman, county planning board member

===== Declined =====
- Sidney Kramer, former county executive (endorsed Duncan)
- Neal Potter, incumbent county executive (endorsed Adams)

==== Results ====
Democratic primary results
Party	Candidate	Votes	%
Democratic	Douglas Duncan	34,261	43.0%
Democratic	Bruce Adams	27,051	33.9%
Democratic	Gus Bauman	18,447	23.1%

=== Republican primary ===
==== Candidates ====
===== Nominee =====
- Stephen Abrams, member of the Montgomery County Board of Education

===== Eliminated in primary =====
- Albert Ceccone, real estate consultant and perennial candidate
- Allen Prettyman, police officer
- Carol Trawick, business owner

==== Results ====
Republican primary results
Party	Candidate	Votes	%
Republican	Stephen Abrams	13,632	39.4%
Republican	Carol Trawick	11,674	33.7%
Republican	Allen Prettyman	4,963	14.3%
Republican	Albert Ceccone	4,335	12.5%

=== General election ===
==== Results ====
Montgomery County Executive election, 1994
Party	Candidate	Votes	%
Democratic	Doug Duncan	60,773	63.6%
Republican	Stephen N. Abrams	34,726	36.4%
Democratic hold			

== Prince George's County ==
=== Democratic primary ===
==== Candidates ====
===== Nominee =====
- Wayne Curry, lawyer and former president of the Prince George's County Chamber of Commerce

===== Eliminated in primary =====
- Sue V. Mills, county councilmember
- Artie Polk, pastor and candidate for county executive in 1990
- Beatrice P. Tignor, state senator

===== Withdrawn =====
- Richard J. Castaldi, former mayor of Greenbelt (endorsed Mills)

==== Results ====
Democratic primary results
Party	Candidate	Votes	%
Democratic	Wayne Curry	35,556	42.4%
Democratic	Beatrice P. Tignor	30,297	36.1%
Democratic	Sue V. Mills	17,062	20.3%
Democratic	Artie Polk	951	1.1%

=== Republican primary ===
==== Candidates ====
===== Nominee =====
- Robert B. Ostrom, lawyer

===== Declined =====
- Charles A. Dukes, business executive
- Larry Hogan, real estate broker, son of former county executive Lawrence Hogan, and nominee for Maryland's 5th congressional district in 1992
- Raymond LaPlaca, business executive
- Michael Steele, lawyer

==== Results ====
Republican primary results
Party	Candidate	Votes	%
Republican	Robert B. Ostrom	Unopposed	

=== General election ===
==== Results ====
Prince George's County Executive election, 1994
Party	Candidate	Votes	%
Democratic	Wayne Curry	103,423	67.3%
Republican	Robert B. Ostrom	50,333	32.7%
Democratic hold			
