= 1986 Maryland county executive elections =

- November 4, 1986

All 6 of Maryland's county executive seats
	Majority party	Minority party
Party	Democratic	Republican
Last election	6	0
Seats won	6	0
Seat change	Steady	Steady
Democratic
60–70%
70–80%
80–90%

The Maryland county executive elections of 1986 took place on November 4, 1986. Anne Arundel County, Baltimore County, Harford County, Howard County, Montgomery County, and Prince George's County elected county executives.

== Anne Arundel County ==
=== Democratic primary ===
==== Candidates ====
===== Nominee =====
- O. James Lighthizer, incumbent county executive

==== Results ====
Democratic primary results
Party	Candidate	Votes	%
Democratic	O. James Lighthizer	Unopposed	

=== Republican primary ===
==== Candidates ====
===== Nominee =====
- Louise M. R. Beauregard, lobbyist

===== Eliminated in primary =====
- Carol Defibaugh, registered nurse
- John Grasso, chef

==== Results ====
Republican primary results
Party	Candidate	Votes	%
Republican	Louise R. M. Beauregard	3,366	35.4%
Republican	John Grasso	3,257	34.2%
Republican	Carol A. Defibaugh	2,876	30.2%

=== General election ===
==== Results ====
Anne Arundel County Executive election, 1986
Party	Candidate	Votes	%
Democratic	O. James Lighthizer (incumbent)	71,500	80.4%
Republican	Louise R. M. Beauregard	17,404	19.6%
Democratic hold			

== Baltimore County ==
=== Democratic primary ===
==== Candidates ====
===== Nominee =====
- Dennis F. Rasmussen, state senator

===== Eliminated in primary =====
- Elmer H. Kahline Jr., Baltimore County Clerk of the Circuit Court
- Thomas B. Kernan, state delegate
- John W. O'Rourke, county councilmember

==== Results ====
Democratic primary results
Party	Candidate	Votes	%
Democratic	Dennis F. Rasmussen	55,000	46.1%
Democratic	Thomas B. Kernan	38,748	32.5%
Democratic	John W. O'Rourke	19,969	16.7%
Democratic	Elmer H. Kahline Jr.	5,443	4.5%

=== Republican primary ===
==== Candidates ====
===== Nominee =====
- Robert T. Petr, insurance executive

==== Results ====
Republican primary results
Party	Candidate	Votes	%
Republican	Robert T. Petr	Unopposed	

=== General election ===
==== Results ====
Baltimore County Executive election, 1986
Party	Candidate	Votes	%
Democratic	Dennis F. Rasmussen	150,195	81.5%
Republican	Robert T. Petr	34,071	18.5%
Democratic hold			

== Harford County ==
=== Democratic primary ===
==== Candidates ====
===== Nominee =====
- Habern W. Freeman, incumbent county executive

==== Results ====
Democratic primary results
Party	Candidate	Votes	%
Democratic	Habern W. Freeman (incumbent)	Unopposed	

=== Republican primary ===
==== Candidates ====
===== Nominee =====
- C. Joseph Bernardo, former county councilmember and nominee for county executive in 1982

==== Results ====
Republican primary results
Party	Candidate	Votes	%
Republican	C. Joseph Bernardo	Unopposed	

=== General election ===
==== Results ====
Harford County Executive election, 1986
Party	Candidate	Votes	%
Democratic	Habern W. Freeman (incumbent)	26,433	68.5%
Republican	C. Joseph Bernardo	12,178	31.5%
Democratic hold			

== Howard County ==
=== Democratic primary ===
==== Candidates ====
===== Nominee =====
- Elizabeth Bobo, county councilmember

===== Eliminated in primary =====
- James H. Clark, county councilmember

==== Results ====
Democratic primary results
Party	Candidate	Votes	%
Democratic	Elizabeth Bobo	13,675	68.6%
Democratic	James H. Clark	6,247	31.3%

=== Republican primary ===
==== Candidates ====
===== Nominee =====
- Gilbert South, businessman

==== Results ====
Republican primary results
Party	Candidate	Votes	%
Republican	Gilbert South	Unopposed	

=== General election ===
==== Results ====
Howard County Executive election, 1986
Party	Candidate	Votes	%
Democratic	Elizabeth Bobo	25,829	63.3%
Republican	Gilbert South	14,995	36.7%
Democratic hold			

== Montgomery County ==
=== Democratic primary ===
==== Candidates ====
===== Nominee =====
- Sidney Kramer, state senator

===== Eliminated in primary =====
- David Robbins, Montgomery County Recreation Director
- David Scull, county councilmember

===== Declined =====
- Charles W. Gilchrist, incumbent county executive

==== Results ====
Democratic primary results
Party	Candidate	Votes	%
Democratic	Sidney Kramer	51,039	60.0%
Democratic	David Scull	27,645	32.5%
Democratic	David Robbins	6,451	7.6%

=== Republican primary ===
==== Candidates ====
===== Nominee =====
- Edward J. Gannon, businessman

===== Eliminated in primary =====
- Albert Ceccone, real estate consultant and perennial candidate

==== Results ====
Republican primary results
Party	Candidate	Votes	%
Republican	Edward J. Gannon	17,770	66.3%
Republican	Albert Ceccone	9,023	33.7%

=== General election ===
==== Results ====
Montgomery County Executive election, 1986
Party	Candidate	Votes	%
Democratic	Sidney Kramer	117,731	63.8%
Republican	Edward J. Gannon	66,868	36.2%
Democratic hold			

== Prince George's County ==
=== Democratic primary ===
==== Candidates ====
===== Nominee =====
- Parris Glendening, incumbent county executive

===== Eliminated in primary =====
- Arthur B. Haynes, schoolteacher and candidate for county executive in 1982

==== Results ====
Democratic primary results
Party	Candidate	Votes	%
Democratic	Parris Glendening (incumbent)	50,521	88.1%
Democratic	Arthur B. Haynes	6,817	11.9%

=== Republican primary ===
==== Candidates ====
===== Nominee =====
- R. Dan Ritchie, president of the Prince George's Civic Federation

==== Results ====
Republican primary results
Party	Candidate	Votes	%
Republican	R. Dan Ritchie	Unopposed	

=== General election ===
==== Results ====
Prince George's County Executive election, 1986
Party	Candidate	Votes	%
Democratic	Parris Glendening (incumbent)	91,290	77.8%
Republican	R. Dan Ritchie	26,072	22.2%
Democratic hold			
