= 2010 Maryland county executive elections =

- November 2, 2010

All 7 of Maryland's county executive seats
	Majority party	Minority party
Party	Democratic	Republican
Last election	5	2
Seats won	5	2
Seat change	Steady	Steady
Popular vote	702,816	441,592
Percentage	59.81%	37.58%
Democratic
50–60%
60–70%
>90%
Republican
50–60%
70-80%

The Maryland county executive elections of 2010 were held on November 2, 2010. Anne Arundel County, Baltimore County, Harford County, Howard County, Montgomery County, Prince George's County, and Wicomico County elected county executives. This race coincided with the election for Maryland county offices elections, 2010.

== Race summary ==
County	County executive	Party	First elected	Last race	Status	Candidates
Anne Arundel County	John R. Leopold	Republican	2006	51.0% R	Incumbent re-elected.	▌John R. Leopold (Republican) 50.4%; ▌Joanna Conti (Democratic) 44.0%; ▌Mike Shay (Democratic) 5.4%
Baltimore County	James T. Smith Jr.	Democratic	2002	66.3% D	Incumbent term-limited. Democratic hold.	▌Kevin Kamenetz (Democratic) 53.7%; ▌Kenneth Holt (Republican) 46.2%
Harford County	David R. Craig	Republican	2006	52.0% R	Incumbent re-elected.	▌David R. Craig (Republican) 79.3%; ▌Mark Fisher (Constitution) 19.3%
Howard County	Ken Ulman	Democratic	2006	52.1% D	Incumbent re-elected.	▌Ken Ulman (Democratic) 62.5%; ▌Trent Kittleman (Republican) 37.5%
Montgomery County	Ike Leggett	Democratic	2006	67.4% D	Incumbent re-elected.	▌Ike Leggett (Democratic) 65.6%; ▌Douglas Rosenfeld (Republican) 34.2%
Prince George's County	Jack B. Johnson	Democratic	2002	97.6% D	Incumbent term-limited. Democratic hold.	▌Rushern Baker (Democratic) 99.3%
Wicomico County	Richard Pollitt	Democratic	2006	55.0% D	Incumbent re-elected.	▌Richard Pollitt (Democratic) 51.5%; ▌Joe Ollinger (Republican) 48.4%

== Anne Arundel County ==
2010 Anne Arundel County executive election

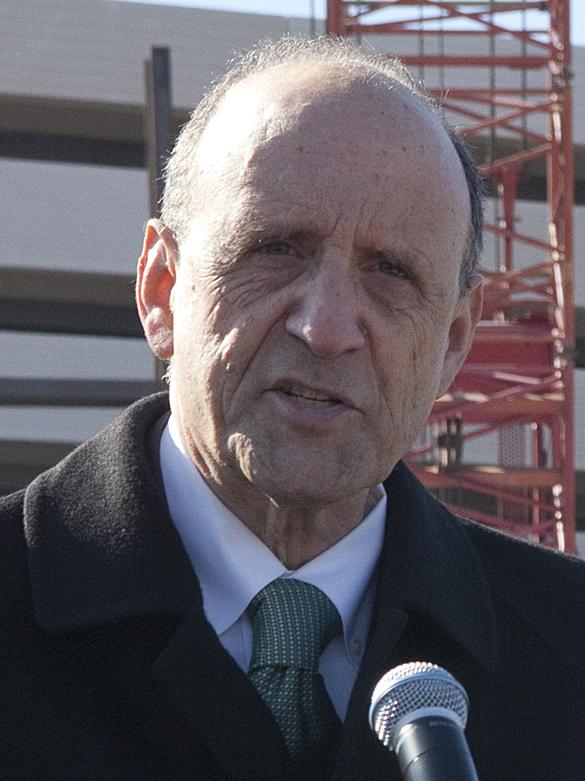

Nominee	John Leopold	Joanna Conti	Mike Shay
Party	Republican	Democratic	Green
Popular vote	98,654	86,230	10,618
Percentage	50.4%	44.0%	5.4%
- Leopold: 40–50% 50–60% 60–70% Conti: 40–50% 50–60% 60–70% 70–80% 80–90%
County Executive before election
John Leopold
Republican
Elected County Executive
John Leopold
Republican

=== Candidates ===
==== Republican ====
- John Leopold, incumbent County Executive and former Maryland State Delegate

==== Democratic ====
- Joanna Conti, former Colorado congressional candidate and businesswoman

==== Green ====
- Mike Shay

=== Results ===
Anne Arundel County Executive election, 2010
Party	Candidate	Votes	%
Republican	John R. Leopold (inc.)	98,654	50.39
Democratic	Joanna L. Conti	86,230	44.04
Green	Mike Shay	10,618	5.42
Write-ins		298	0.15
Total votes		195,800	100.00

== Baltimore County ==
2010 Baltimore County executive election

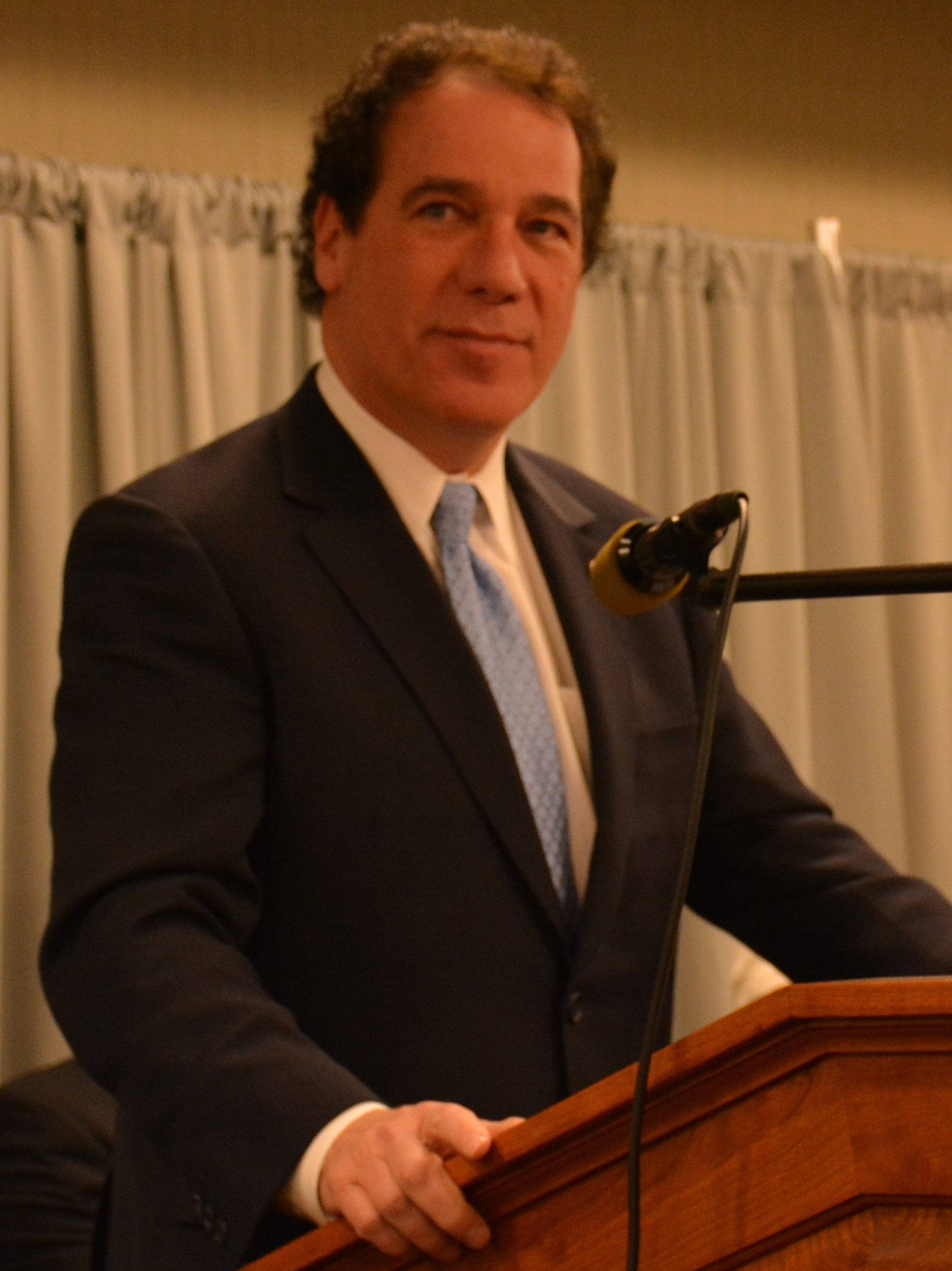

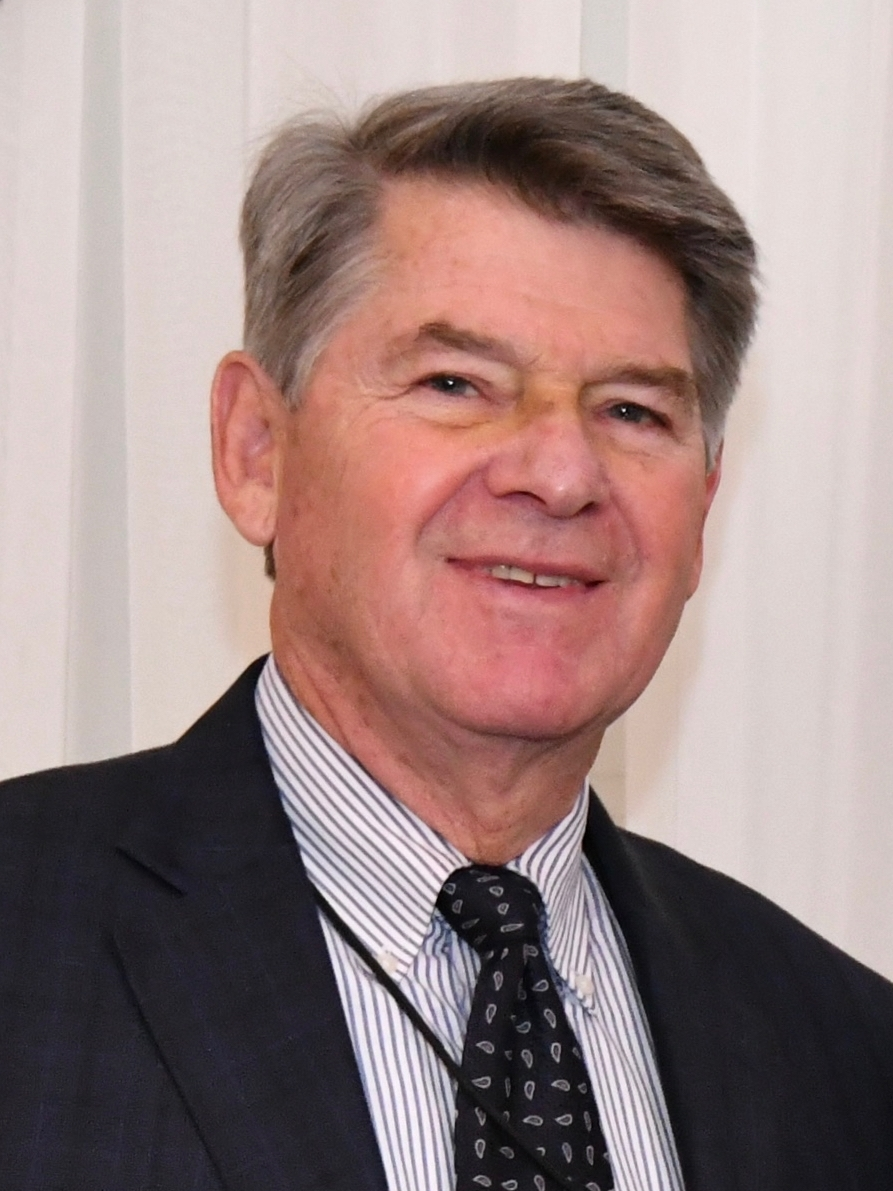
Nominee	Kevin Kamenetz	Kenneth Holt
Party	Democratic	Republican
Popular vote	148,659	127,882
Percentage	53.7%	46.2%
- Kamenetz: 50–60% 60–70% 70–80% 80–90% >90% Holt: 50–60% 60–70% 70–80%
County Executive before election
James T. Smith, Jr.
Democratic
Elected County Executive
Kevin Kamenetz
Democratic

Incumbent County Executive James T. Smith is prevented from seeking a third term due to term limits, creating an open seat.

=== Candidates ===
==== Democratic ====
- Kevin Kamenetz, Baltimore County Councilman

==== Republican ====
- Kenneth Holt, former Maryland State Delegate

=== Results ===
Baltimore County Executive election, 2010
Party	Candidate	Votes	%
Democratic	Kevin B. Kamenetz	148,659	53.68
Republican	Kenneth C. Holt	127,882	46.17
Write-ins		417	0.15
Total votes		276,958	100.00

== Harford County ==
2010 Harford County executive election

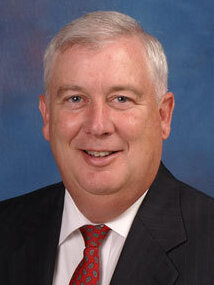

Nominee	David R. Craig	Mark Fisher
Party	Republican	Constitution
Popular vote	67,972	16,268
Percentage	79.3%	19.3%
- Craig: 50–60% 60–70% 70–80% 80–90%
County Executive before election
David R. Craig
Republican
Elected County Executive
David R. Craig
Republican

=== Candidates ===
==== Republicans ====
- David R. Craig, incumbent County Executive, former Maryland State Senator, former Maryland State Delegate, former Mayor of Havre de Grace

==== Constitution ====
- Mark Fisher

=== Results ===
Harford County Executive election, 2010
Party	Candidate	Votes	%
Republican	David R. Craig	67,972	79.26
Constitution	Mark Fisher	16,268	19.26
Write-ins		665	0.78
Total votes		85,005	100.00

== Howard County ==
2010 Howard County executive election

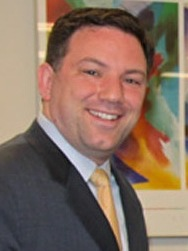

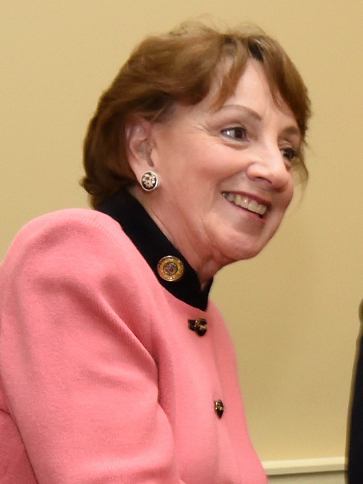
Nominee	Kenneth Ulman	Trent Kittleman
Party	Democratic	Republican
Popular vote	61,884	37,105
Percentage	62.5%	37.5%
- Precinct results Kamenetz: 50–60% 60–70% 70–80% 80–90% Kittleman: 50–60% 60–70% Tie: 50%
County Executive before election
Kenneth Ulman
Democratic
Elected County Executive
Kenneth Ulman
Democratic

=== Candidates ===
==== Democratic ====
- Kenneth Ulman, incumbent County Executive, former Howard County Councilman

==== Republicans ====
- Trent Kittleman

Howard County Executive election, 2010
Party	Candidate	Votes	%
Democratic	Kenneth Ulman	61,884	62.46
Republican	Trent M. Kittleman	37,105	37.45
Write-ins		84	0.08
Total votes		99,073	100.00

== Montgomery County ==
2010 Montgomery County executive election

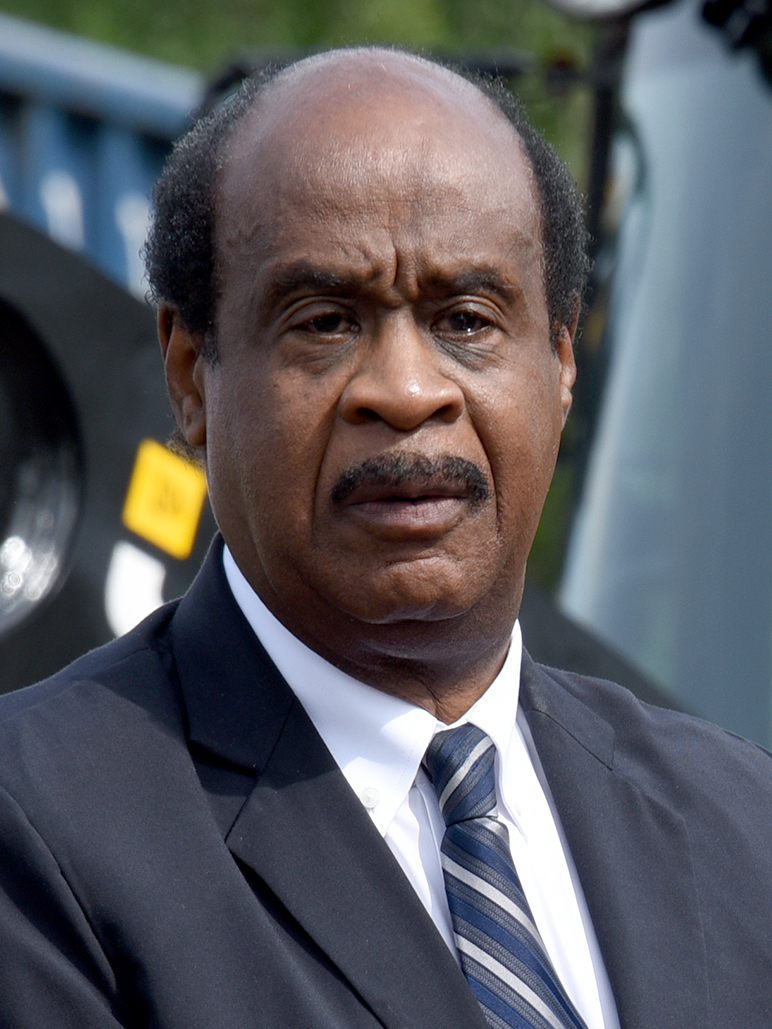

Nominee	Ike Leggett	Douglas Rosenfeld
Party	Democratic	Republican
Popular vote	184,097	95,869
Percentage	65.6%	34.2%
- Leggett: 50–60% 60–70% 70–80% 80–90% >90% Rosenfeld: 50–60% 60–70%
County Executive before election
Kenneth Ulman
Democratic
Elected County Executive
Kenneth Ulman
Democratic

=== Candidates ===
==== Democratic primary ====
- Isiah Leggett, incumbent County Executive, former Montgomery County councilman, former chairman of the Maryland Democratic Party

==== Republican ====
- Douglas E. Rosenfeld

Montgomery County Executive election, 2010
Party	Candidate	Votes	%
Democratic	Ike Leggett	184,097	65.58
Republican	Douglas E. Rosenfeld	95,869	34.15
Write-ins		747	0.27
Total votes		280,713	100.00

== Prince George's County ==
2010 Prince George's County executive election

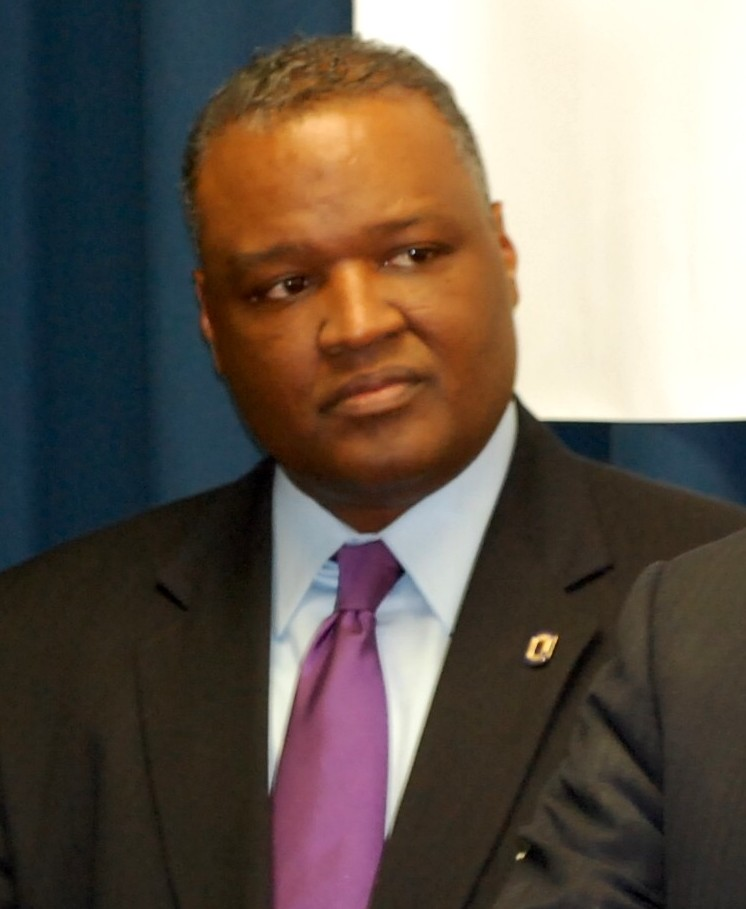
Nominee	Rushern Baker
Party	Democratic
Popular vote	206,924
Percentage	99.3%
County Executive before election
Jack B. Johnson
Democratic
Elected County Executive
Rushern Baker
Democratic

The current County Executive, Democrat Jack B. Johnson, was precluded from seeking a third term by term limits.

=== Democratic primary ===
==== Candidates ====
- Rushern Baker, former Maryland State Delegate
- Michael A. Jackson, former Prince George's County Sheriff
- Samuel Dean, Prince George's County Councilman
- Gerron Levi, Maryland State Delegate
- Henry C. Turner, Jr., businessman

==== Results ====
Democratic primary results
Party	Candidate	Votes	%
Democratic	Rushern Baker III	41,352	43.93
Democratic	Michael A. Jackson	30,788	32.71
Democratic	Samuel H. Dean	11,728	12.46
Democratic	Gerron Levi	6,983	7.42
Democratic	Henry C. Turner, Jr.	3,272	3.48
Total votes		94,123	100.00

=== General election ===
==== Results ====
Prince George's County Executive election, 2010
Party	Candidate	Votes	%
Democratic	Rushern Baker III	206,924	99.26
Write-ins		1,543	0.74
Total votes		208,467	100.00

== Wicomico County ==
2010 Wicomico County executive election
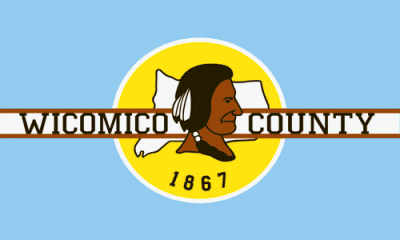

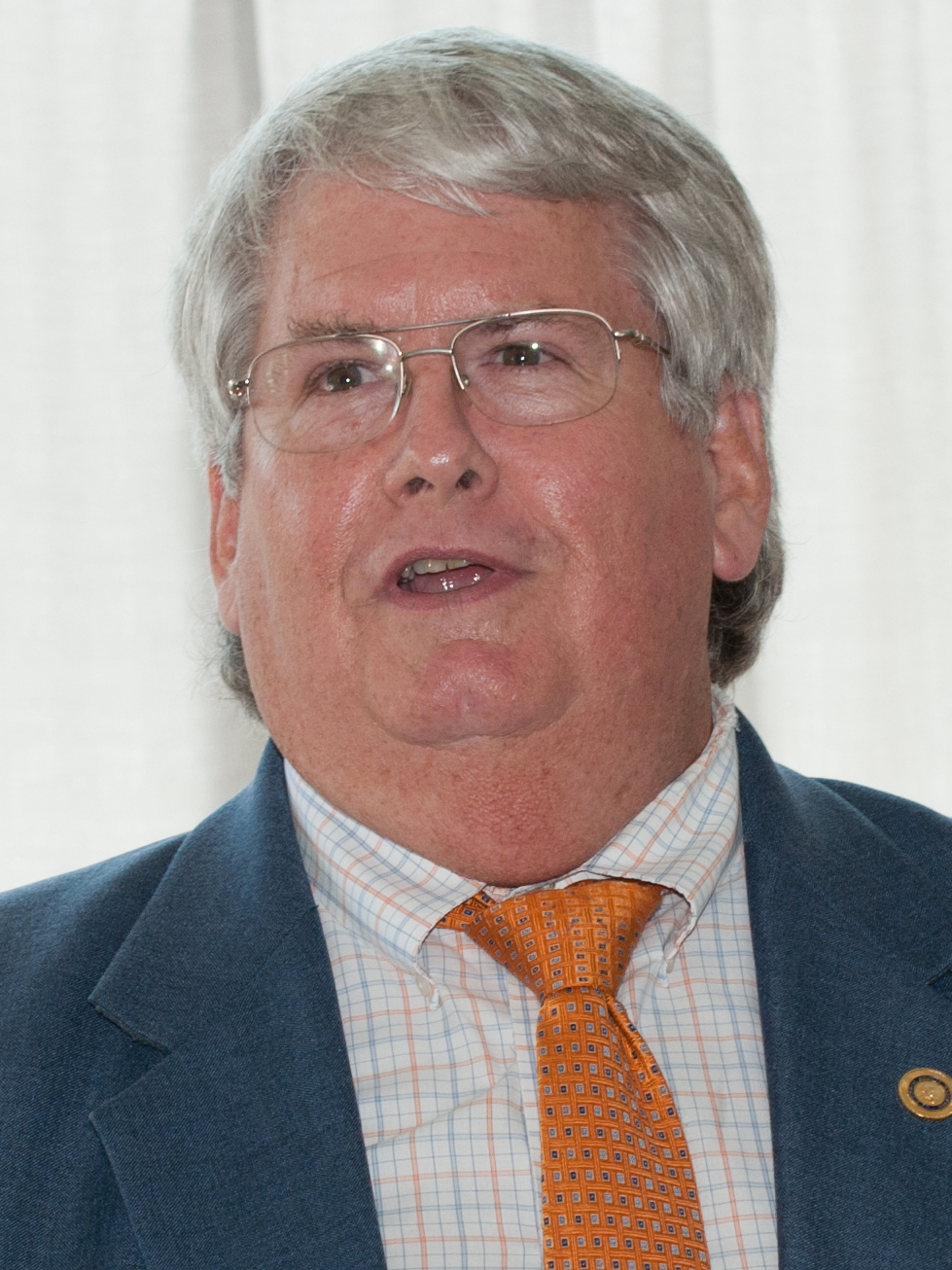

Nominee	Richard Pollitt	Joe Ollinger
Party	Democratic	Republican
Popular vote	15,022	14,110
Percentage	51.5%	48.4%
- Pollitt: 50–60% 60–70% 70–80% >90% Ollinger: 50–60% 60–70% 70–80%
County Executive before election
Richard Pollitt
Democratic
Elected County Executive
Richard Pollitt
Democratic

=== Candidates ===
==== Democratic ====
- Rick Pollitt, incumbent County Executive and former Fruitland, MD City Manager
- Tom Taylor
- John W. Baker

==== Republicans ====
- Joe Ollinger

=== Primary results ===
Democratic primary results
Party	Candidate	Votes	%
Democratic	Richard Pollitt (inc.)	3,734	66.93
Democratic	John W. Baker	1,107	19.84
Democratic	Tom Taylor	738	13.23
Total votes		5,579	100.00

=== General election results ===
Wicomico County Executive election, 2010
Party	Candidate	Votes	%
Democratic	Richard Pollitt (inc.)	15,022	51.53
Republican	Joe Ollinger	14,110	48.40
Write-ins		21	0.07
Total votes		29,153	100.00
