= Hugh Nichols =

Hugh Nichols may refer to:

- Hugh L. Nichols, lieutenant governor of Ohio
- J. Hugh Nichols, politician in Maryland
- Hugh Nichols, wrestler & former World Middleweight Champion
