= 1978 Maryland county executive elections =

- November 7, 1978

All 6 of Maryland's county executive seats
	Majority party	Minority party
Party	Democratic	Republican
Last election	4	2
Seats won	4	2
Seat change	Steady	Steady
Democratic
50–60%
60–70%
70–80%
Republican
50-60%
60-70%

The Maryland county executive elections of 1978 took place on November 7, 1978. Anne Arundel County, Baltimore County, Harford County, Howard County, Montgomery County, and Prince George's County elected county executives.

== Anne Arundel County ==
=== Republican primary ===
==== Candidates ====
===== Nominee =====
- Robert A. Pascal, incumbent county executive (previously ran for governor)

===== Eliminated in primary =====
- Daniel J. Bedsole, barber shop owner

==== Results ====
Republican primary results
Party	Candidate	Votes	%
Republican	Robert A. Pascal (incumbent)	9,165	81.8%
Republican	Daniel J. Bedsole	2,034	18.2%

=== Democratic primary ===
==== Candidates ====
===== Nominee =====
- Elmer E. Dunn Sr., accountant

===== Eliminated in primary =====
- Charles G. Taylor, administrative hearing officer
- Marvin O. Morris, perennial candidate
- Frederick R. Poole, retired business consultant and perennial candidate

==== Results ====
Democratic primary results
Party	Candidate	Votes	%
Democratic	Elmer E. Dunn Sr.	13,296	45.2%
Democratic	Charles G. Taylor	10,815	36.8%
Democratic	Marvin O. Morris	3,126	10.6%
Democratic	Frederick R. Poole	2,157	7.3%

=== General election ===
==== Results ====
Anne Arundel County Executive election, 1978
Party	Candidate	Votes	%
Republican	Robert A. Pascal (incumbent)	49,323	62.2%
Democratic	Elmer E. Dunn Sr.	30,013	37.8%
Republican hold			

== Baltimore County ==
=== Democratic primary ===
==== Candidates ====
===== Nominee =====
- Donald P. Hutchinson, state senator

===== Eliminated in primary =====
- Lorraine F. Chircus, county school board member
- John C. Coolahan, state senator
- S. Eric DiNenna, county zoning commissioner
- Edward A. Griffith, real estate broker
- John V. Murphy, county councilmember
- Howard J. Needle, state delegate

==== Results ====
Democratic primary results
Party	Candidate	Votes	%
Democratic	Donald P. Hutchinson	28,637	23.5%
Democratic	John C. Coolahan	24,969	20.5%
Democratic	Howard J. Neelde	23,054	18.9%
Democratic	John V. Murphy	21,159	17.3%
Democratic	S. Eric DiNenna	15,535	12.7%
Democratic	Edward A. Griffith	5,337	4.4%
Democratic	Lorraine F. Chircus	3,302	2.7%

=== Republican primary ===
==== Candidates ====
===== Nominee =====
- Eugene L. Kibbe Jr., county councilmember

===== Eliminated in primary =====
- Joan L. Edwards
- Clarence E. Ritter, county councilmember

==== Results ====
Republican primary results
Party	Candidate	Votes	%
Republican	Eugene L. Kibbe Jr.	10,622	56.0%
Republican	Clarence E. Ritter	5,881	31.0%
Republican	Joan L. Edwards	2,461	13.0%

=== General election ===
==== Results ====
Baltimore County Executive election, 1978
Party	Candidate	Votes	%
Democratic	Donald P. Hutchinson	106,518	58.0%
Republican	Eugene L. Kibbe Jr.	77,006	42.0%
Democratic hold			

== Harford County ==
=== Democratic primary ===
==== Candidates ====
===== Nominee =====
- J. Thomas Barranger, candidate for the Maryland House of Delegates in 1974

===== Eliminated in primary =====
- Charles B. Anderson Jr., incumbent county executive
- William Cooper Jr., county councilmember

==== Results ====
Democratic primary results
Party	Candidate	Votes	%
Democratic	J. Thomas Barranger	7,685	43.5%
Democratic	Charles B. Anderson Jr. (incumbent)	5,539	31.3%
Democratic	William Cooper Jr.	4,453	25.2%

=== Republican primary ===
==== Candidates ====
===== Nominee =====
- William B. Davidson Jr., former chair of the Harford County Economic Development Commission

===== Eliminated in primary =====
- C. Joseph Bernardo, history professor

==== Results ====
Republican primary results
Party	Candidate	Votes	%
Republican	William B. Davidson Jr.	2,824	63.1%
Republican	C. Joseph Bernardo	1,650	36.9%

=== General election ===
==== Results ====
Harford County Executive election, 1978
Party	Candidate	Votes	%
Democratic	J. Thomas Barranger	18,533	60.6%
Republican	William B. Davidson Jr.	12,069	39.4%
Democratic hold			

== Howard County ==
=== Democratic primary ===
==== Candidates ====
===== Nominee =====
- J. Hugh Nichols, state delegate

===== Eliminated in primary =====
- Edward L. Cochran, incumbent county executive
- William B. Davidson Jr., former justice of the peace

==== Results ====
Democratic primary results
Party	Candidate	Votes	%
Democratic	J. Hugh Nichols	9,257	57.2%
Democratic	Edward L. Cochran (incumbent)	6,083	37.6%
Democratic	C. Howard Strahler, Jr.	848	5.2%

=== Republican primary ===
==== Candidates ====
- James S. Ansell, lawyer and candidate for Howard County Executive in 1970

==== Results ====
Republican primary results
Party	Candidate	Votes	%
Republican	James S. Ansell	Unopposed	

=== General election ===
==== Results ====
Howard County Executive election, 1978
Party	Candidate	Votes	%
Democratic	J. Hugh Nichols	23,134	79.5%
Republican	James S. Ansell	5,970	20.5%
Democratic hold			

== Montgomery County ==
=== Republican primary ===
==== Candidates ====
===== Nominee =====
- Richmond M. Keeney, former county councilmember

===== Eliminated in primary =====
- Albert Ceccone, real estate and insurance broker
- Gerald C. Warren

==== Results ====
Republican primary results
Party	Candidate	Votes	%
Republican	Richmond M. Keeney	11,385	57.2%
Republican	Albert Ceccone	5,198	26.1%
Republican	Gerald C. Warren	3,304	16.6%

=== Democratic primary ===
==== Candidates ====
===== Nominee =====
- Charles W. Gilchrist, state senator

===== Eliminated in primary =====
- Royce Hanson, chair of the Montgomery County Planning Board
- John L. Menke, county councilmember

==== Results ====
Democratic primary results
Party	Candidate	Votes	%
Democratic	Charles W. Gilchrist	28,418	47.0%
Democratic	Royce Hanson	20,141	33.3%
Democratic	John L. Menke	11,881	19.7%

=== General election ===
==== Results ====
Montgomery County Executive election, 1978
Party	Candidate	Votes	%
Democratic	Charles W. Gilchrist	98,385	62.4%
Republican	Richmond M. Keeney	59,298	37.6%
Democratic gain from Republican			

== Prince George's County ==
=== Democratic primary ===
==== Candidates ====
===== Nominee =====
- Winfield M. Kelly Jr., incumbent county executive

===== Eliminated in primary =====
- John Lee Ball Jr., newspaper ad salesman
- Vincent Goodsell, former director of the Prince George's County Aging Programs
- John Eugene Sellner, real estate sales associate

==== Results ====
Democratic primary results
Party	Candidate	Votes	%
Democratic	Winfield M. Kelly Jr. (incumbent)	29,003	57.9%
Democratic	Vincent Goodsell	9,384	18.7%
Democratic	John Lee Ball Jr.	8,094	16.2%
Democratic	John Eugene Sellner	3,607	7.2%

=== Republican primary ===
==== Candidates ====
===== Nominee =====
- Lawrence Hogan, former U.S. representative from Maryland's 5th congressional district

===== Eliminated in primary =====
- Martin Aragona, real estate developer
- Dale Everett

==== Results ====
Republican primary results
Party	Candidate	Votes	%
Republican	Lawrence Hogan	9,831	72.1%
Republican	Martin Aragona	3,309	24.3%
Republican	Dale D. Everett	495	3.6%

=== General election ===
==== Results ====
Prince George's County Executive election, 1978
Party	Candidate	Votes	%
Republican	Lawrence Hogan	66,424	57.9%
Democratic	Winfield M. Kelly Jr. (incumbent)	48,207	42.1%
Republican gain from Democratic			
