= 1982 Maryland county executive elections =

- November 2, 1982

All 6 of Maryland's county executive seats
	Majority party	Minority party
Party	Democratic	Republican
Last election	4	2
Seats won	6	0
Seat change	▲2	▼2
Democratic
50–60%
60–70%
70–80%
100%

The Maryland county executive elections of 1982 took place on November 2, 1982. Anne Arundel County, Baltimore County, Harford County, Howard County, Montgomery County, and Prince George's County elected county executives.

== Anne Arundel County ==
=== Republican primary ===
==== Candidates ====
===== Nominee =====
- John R. Hammond, Annapolis alderman

===== Eliminated in primary =====
- Raymond G. Boileau, consultant

===== Withdrawn =====
- Robert R. Neall, state delegate (ran for re-election)

==== Results ====
Republican primary results
Party	Candidate	Votes	%
Republican	John R. Hammond	9,261	71.9%
Republican	Raymond G. Boileau	3,615	28.1%

=== Democratic primary ===
==== Candidates ====
===== Nominee =====
- O. James Lighthizer, state delegate

===== Eliminated in primary =====
- George F. Bachman, chair of the Anne Arundel County Council
- William H. Brill, county councilmember
- John T. Cecil, former deputy secretary of the Maryland Department of Agriculture
- Elmer E. Dunn Sr., accountant and nominee for county executive in 1978
- H. Erie Schafer, state senator

==== Results ====
Democratic primary results
Party	Candidate	Votes	%
Democratic	O. James Lighthizer	15,009	31.5%
Democratic	George F. Bachman	14,355	30.2%
Democratic	H. Erie Schafer	14,308	30.1%
Democratic	Elmer K. Dunn Sr.	1,970	4.1%
Democratic	William H. Brill	1,962	4.1%

=== General election ===
==== Results ====
Anne Arundel County Executive election, 1982
Party	Candidate	Votes	%
Democratic	O. James Lighthizer	59,816	63.5%
Republican	John R. Hammond	34,336	36.5%
Democratic gain from Republican			

== Baltimore County ==
=== Democratic primary ===
==== Candidates ====
===== Nominee =====
- Donald P. Hutchinson, incumbent county executive

===== Eliminated in primary =====
- Joseph Weir, General Motors employee

==== Results ====
Democratic primary results
Party	Candidate	Votes	%
Democratic	Donald P. Hutchinson (incumbent)	87,028	88.0%
Democratic	Joseph Weir	11,862	12.0%

=== Republican primary ===
==== Candidates ====
===== Nominee =====
- John Brandau, businessman

===== Eliminated in primary =====
- Leonard Kraus, businessman

==== Results ====
Republican primary results
Party	Candidate	Votes	%
Republican	John E. Brandau	8,078	55.7%
Republican	Leonard A. Kraus	6,423	44.3%

=== General election ===
==== Results ====
Baltimore County Executive election, 1982
Party	Candidate	Votes	%
Democratic	Donald P. Hutchinson (incumbent)	143,801	78.5%
Republican	John E. Brandau	39,403	21.5%
Democratic hold			

== Harford County ==
=== Democratic primary ===
==== Candidates ====
===== Nominee =====
- Habern W. Freeman, former county councilmember

===== Eliminated in primary =====
- Donald W. Androsky, executive director of the Harford County Chamber of Commerce
- J. Thomas Barranger, incumbent county executive
- Charles Boutin, former member of the Harford County Board of Education
- William O. Carr, mayor of Bel Air
- John A. Kennedy, candidate for U.S. Senate in 1980
- Frank Soltis, real estate consultant and perennial candidate

==== Results ====
Democratic primary results
Party	Candidate	Votes	%
Democratic	Habern W. Freeman	6,524	33.3%
Democratic	J. Thomas Barranger (incumbent)	6,450	32.9%
Democratic	William O. Carr	2,700	13.8%
Democratic	Charles Boutin	1,970	10.0%
Democratic	Donald W. Androsky	1,965	10.0%
Democratic	John A. Kennedy	885	4.5%
Democratic	Frank W. Soltis	253	1.3%

=== Republican primary ===
==== Candidates ====
===== Nominee =====
- C. Joseph Bernardo, former county councilmember

==== Results ====
Republican primary results
Party	Candidate	Votes	%
Republican	C. Joseph Bernardo	Unopposed	

=== General election ===
==== Results ====
Harford County Executive election, 1982
Party	Candidate	Votes	%
Democratic	Habern W. Freeman	25,108	68.2%
Republican	C. Joseph Bernardo	11,712	31.8%
Democratic hold			

== Howard County ==
=== Democratic primary ===
==== Candidates ====
===== Nominee =====
- J. Hugh Nichols, incumbent county executive

==== Results ====
Democratic primary results
Party	Candidate	Votes	%
Democratic	J. Hugh Nichols	Unopposed	

=== General election ===
==== Results ====
Howard County Executive election, 1982
Party	Candidate	Votes	%
Democratic	J. Hugh Nichols (incumbent)	Unopposed	
Democratic hold			

== Montgomery County ==
=== Democratic primary ===
==== Candidates ====
===== Nominee =====
- Charles W. Gilchrist, incumbent county executive

===== Eliminated in primary =====
- Wade Dunn, businessman

==== Results ====
Democratic primary results
Party	Candidate	Votes	%
Democratic	Charles W. Gilchrist (incumbent)	30,010	66.6%
Democratic	Wade Dunn	15,040	33.4%

=== Republican primary ===
==== Candidates ====
===== Nominee =====
- Joseph McGrath, banker

===== Eliminated in primary =====
- John Hewitt, former campaign treasurer for county executive Charles W. Gilchrist
- Luiz R. S. Simmons, state delegate

==== Results ====
Republican primary results
Party	Candidate	Votes	%
Republican	Joseph McGrath	9,466	41.0%
Republican	Luiz R. S. Simmons	7,274	31.5%
Republican	John P. Hewitt	6,360	27.5%

=== General election ===
==== Results ====
Montgomery County Executive election, 1982
Party	Candidate	Votes	%
Democratic	Charles W. Gilchrist (incumbent)	107,272	58.8%
Republican	Joseph C. McGrath	75,189	41.2%
Democratic hold			

== Prince George's County ==
=== Republican primary ===
==== Candidates ====
===== Nominee =====
- Ann Shoch, commissioner of the Maryland-National Capital Park

===== Eliminated in primary =====
- William J. Goodman, C&P Telephone manager

===== Declined =====
- Lawrence Hogan, incumbent county executive (ran for U.S. Senate)

==== Results ====
Republican primary results
Party	Candidate	Votes	%
Republican	Ann Shoch	5,764	53.6%
Republican	William J. Goodman	4,987	46.4%

=== Democratic primary ===
==== Candidates ====
===== Nominee =====
- Parris Glendening, county councilmember

===== Eliminated in primary =====
- John Lee Ball Jr., newspaper ad salesman and candidate for county executive in 1978
- Kenneth W. Cutlip, police officer
- Arthur B. Haynes, schoolteacher

==== Results ====
Democratic primary results
Party	Candidate	Votes	%
Democratic	Parris Glendening	32,174	70.1%
Democratic	J. Lee Ball	5,529	12.0%
Democratic	Kenneth W. Cutlip	4,923	10.7%
Democratic	Arthur B. Haynes	3,261	7.1%

=== General election ===
==== Results ====
Prince George's County Executive election, 1982
Party	Candidate	Votes	%
Democratic	Parris Glendening	89,891	72.2%
Republican	Ann Shoch	34,538	27.8%
Democratic gain from Republican			
