= Lighthizer =

Lighthizer is a surname. Notable people with the surname include:

- O. James Lighthizer (born 1946), American lawyer and politician
- Robert Lighthizer (born 1947), American lawyer and the eighteenth United States Trade Representative
