= 1990 Maryland county executive elections =

- November 6, 1990

All 6 of Maryland's county executive seats
	Majority party	Minority party
Party	Democratic	Republican
Last election	6	0
Seats won	3	3
Seat change	▼3	▲3
Democratic
50–60%
60–70%
70–80%
Republican
50-60%
60-70%

The Maryland county executive elections of 1990 took place on November 6, 1990. Anne Arundel County, Baltimore County, Harford County, Howard County, Montgomery County, and Prince George's County elected county executives.

== Anne Arundel County ==
=== Democratic primary ===
==== Candidates ====
===== Nominee =====
- Theodore J. Sophocleus, county councilmember

===== Eliminated in primary =====
- Patricia Aiken, former state delegate
- Dennis Callahan, former mayor of Annapolis
- Michael F. Gilligan, county councilmember

==== Results ====
Democratic primary results
Party	Candidate	Votes	%
Democratic	Theodore J. Sophocleus	18,096	42.6%
Democratic	Dennis Callahan	10,113	23.8%
Democratic	Michael F. Gilligan	8,871	20.8%
Democratic	Patricia Aiken	5,386	12.6%

=== Republican primary ===
==== Candidates ====
===== Nominee =====
- Robert R. Neall, former state delegate

===== Eliminated in primary =====
- William J. Steiner Jr., restaurateur

==== Results ====
Republican primary results
Party	Candidate	Votes	%
Republican	Robert R. Neall	15,154	89.8%
Republican	William J. Steiner Jr.	1,714	10.1%

=== General election ===
==== Results ====
Anne Arundel County Executive election, 1990
Party	Candidate	Votes	%
Republican	Robert R. Neall	57,576	51.1%
Democratic	Theodore J. Sophocleus	54,880	48.8%
Republican gain from Democratic			

== Baltimore County ==
=== Democratic primary ===
==== Candidates ====
===== Nominee =====
- Dennis F. Rasmussen, incumbent county executive

==== Results ====
Democratic primary results
Party	Candidate	Votes	%
Democratic	Dennis F. Rasmussen (incumbent)	Unopposed	

=== Republican primary ===
==== Candidates ====
===== Nominee =====
- Roger B. Hayden, former member of the Baltimore County Board of Education

===== Eliminated in primary =====
- Charles P. Harbaugh, businessman and candidate for county executive in 1966
- Robert T. Petr, insurance executive and nominee for county executive in 1986

==== Results ====
Republican primary results
Party	Candidate	Votes	%
Republican	Roger B. Hayden	8,730	62.4%
Republican	Charles P. Harbaugh	3,552	25.3%
Republican	Robert T. Petr	1,707	12.2%

=== General election ===
==== Results ====
Baltimore County Executive election, 1990
Party	Candidate	Votes	%
Republican	Roger B. Hayden	118,665	61.7%
Democratic	Donald P. Hutchinson (incumbent)	73,556	38.2%
Republican gain from Democratic			

== Harford County ==
=== Democratic primary ===
==== Candidates ====
===== Nominee =====
- Eileen M. Rehrmann, state delegate

===== Eliminated in primary =====
- Barbara A. Risacher, county councilmember
- John P. Seisman, accountant

==== Results ====
Democratic primary results
Party	Candidate	Votes	%
Democratic	Eileen M. Rehrmann	11,515	60.1%
Democratic	Barbara A. Risacher	6,218	32.5%
Democratic	John P. Seisman	1,395	7.2%

=== Republican primary ===
==== Candidates ====
===== Nominee =====
- Geoffrey R. Close, former mayor of Bel Air

==== Results ====
Republican primary results
Party	Candidate	Votes	%
Republican	Geoffrey R. Close	Unopposed	

=== General election ===
==== Results ====
Harford County Executive election, 1990
Party	Candidate	Votes	%
Democratic	Eileen M. Rehrmann	22,418	50.8%
Republican	Geoffrey R. Close	21,685	49.1%
Democratic hold			

== Howard County ==
=== Democratic primary ===
==== Candidates ====
===== Nominee =====
- Elizabeth Bobo, incumbent county executive

==== Results ====
Democratic primary results
Party	Candidate	Votes	%
Democratic	Elizabeth Bobo (incumbent)	Unopposed	

=== Republican primary ===
==== Candidates ====
===== Nominee =====
- Charles I. Ecker, former deputy superintendent of Howard County Public Schools

===== Eliminated in primary =====
- Gilbert South, businessman and nominee for county executive in 1986

==== Results ====
Republican primary results
Party	Candidate	Votes	%
Republican	Charles I. Ecker	4,830	67.6%
Republican	Gilbert South	2,305	32.3%

=== General election ===
==== Results ====
Howard County Executive election, 1990
Party	Candidate	Votes	%
Republican	Chuck Ecker	25,637	50.2%
Democratic	Elizabeth Bobo (incumbent)	25,393	49.7%
Republican gain from Democratic			

== Montgomery County ==
=== Democratic primary ===
==== Candidates ====
===== Nominee =====
- Neal Potter, county councilmember

===== Eliminated in primary =====
- Sidney Kramer, incumbent county executive

==== Results ====
Democratic primary results
Party	Candidate	Votes	%
Democratic	Neal Potter	42,303	52.2%
Democratic	Sidney Kramer (incumbent)	38,767	47.8%

=== Republican primary ===
==== Candidates ====
===== Nominee =====
- Albert Ceccone, real estate consultant and perennial candidate

==== Results ====
Republican primary results
Party	Candidate	Votes	%
Republican	Albert Ceccone	Unopposed	

=== General election ===
==== Results ====
Montgomery County Executive election, 1990
Party	Candidate	Votes	%
Democratic	Neal Potter	119,164	61.1%
Republican	Albert Ceccone	37,885	19.4%
Write-in		37,938	19.5%
Democratic hold			

== Prince George's County ==
=== Democratic primary ===
==== Candidates ====
===== Nominee =====
- Parris Glendening, incumbent county executive

===== Eliminated in primary =====
- Arthur B. Haynes, schoolteacher and candidate for county executive in 1982 and 1986
- Artie L. Polk, pastor
- Floyd E. Wilson Jr., county councilmember

==== Results ====
Democratic primary results
Party	Candidate	Votes	%
Democratic	Parris Glendening (incumbent)	51,126	72.9%
Democratic	Floyd E. Wilson Jr.	12,664	18.1%
Democratic	Arthur B. Haynes	4,299	6.1%
Democratic	Artie L. Polk	2,064	2.9%

=== Republican primary ===
==== Candidates ====
===== Nominee =====
- Charles W. Sherren Jr.

==== Results ====
Republican primary results
Party	Candidate	Votes	%
Republican	Charles W. Sherren Jr.	Unopposed	

=== General election ===
==== Results ====
Prince George's County Executive election, 1990
Party	Candidate	Votes	%
Democratic	Parris Glendening (incumbent)	96,026	79.5%
Republican	Charles W. Sherren Jr.	24,825	20.5%
Democratic hold			
