= 1998 Maryland county executive elections =

- November 3, 1998

All 6 of Maryland's county executive seats
	Majority party	Minority party
Party	Democratic	Republican
Last election	4	2
Seats won	5	1
Seat change	▲1	▼1
Popular vote	671,356	280,660
Percentage	70.52%	29.48%
Democratic
50–60%
70–80%
100%
Republican
50-60%

The Maryland county executive elections of 1998 took place on November 3, 1998. Anne Arundel County, Baltimore County, Harford County, Howard County, Montgomery County, and Prince George's County elected county executives.

== Anne Arundel County ==
=== Republican primary ===
==== Candidates ====
===== Nominee =====
- John G. Gary, incumbent county executive

==== Results ====
Republican primary results
Party	Candidate	Votes	%
Republican	John G. Gary (incumbent)	19,003	100.0%

=== Democratic primary ===
==== Candidates ====
===== Nominee =====
- Janet S. Owens, judge of the Anne Arundel County Orphans' Court

===== Eliminated in primary =====
- Diane R. Evans, county councilmember

==== Results ====
Democratic primary results
Party	Candidate	Votes	%
Democratic	Janet S. Owens	20,047	51.3%
Democratic	Diane R. Evans	19,069	48.7%

=== General election ===
==== Results ====
Anne Arundel County Executive election, 1998
Party	Candidate	Votes	%
Democratic	Janet S. Owens	87,676	57.8%
Republican	John G. Gary (incumbent)	63,879	42.1%
Write-in		226	0.1%
Democratic gain from Republican			

== Baltimore County ==
=== Democratic primary ===
==== Candidates ====
===== Nominee =====
- Dutch Ruppersberger, incumbent county executive

==== Results ====
Democratic primary results
Party	Candidate	Votes	%
Democratic	Dutch Ruppersberger (incumbent)	55,700	100.0%

=== Republican primary ===
==== Candidates ====
===== Nominee =====
- John J. Bishop, state delegate

==== Results ====
Republican primary results
Party	Candidate	Votes	%
Republican	John J. Bishop	22,085	100.0%

=== General election ===
==== Results ====
Baltimore County Executive election, 1998
Party	Candidate	Votes	%
Democratic	Dutch Ruppersberger (incumbent)	166,482	70.5%
Republican	John J. Bishop	69,449	29.4%
Write-in		324	0.1%
Democratic hold			

== Harford County ==
=== Democratic primary ===
==== Candidates ====
===== Nominee =====
- Art Helton, former state senator

===== Eliminated in primary =====
- Robert W. Cos, crane safety consultant

==== Results ====
Democratic primary results
Party	Candidate	Votes	%
Democratic	Art Helton	11,173	66.7%
Democratic	Robert W. Cos	5,586	33.3%

=== Republican primary ===
==== Candidates ====
===== Nominee =====
- James M. Harkins, state delegate

===== Eliminated in primary =====
- David R. Craig, state senator
- Vedell Pace, helicopter engineer

==== Results ====
Republican primary results
Party	Candidate	Votes	%
Republican	James M. Harkins	8,522	55.7%
Republican	David R. Craig	6,585	43.0%
Republican	Vedell Pace	192	0.1%

=== General election ===
==== Results ====
Harford County Executive election, 1998
Party	Candidate	Votes	%
Republican	James M. Harkins	37,548	52.2%
Democratic	Art Helton	34,169	47.5%
Write-in		181	0.3%
Republican gain from Democratic			

== Howard County ==
=== Republican primary ===
==== Candidates ====
===== Nominee =====
- Dennis R. Schrader, county councilmember

===== Eliminated in primary =====
- Charles C. Feaga, county councilmember

==== Results ====
Republican primary results
Party	Candidate	Votes	%
Republican	Dennis R. Schrader	7,559	52.3%
Republican	Charles C. Feaga	6,902	47.7%

=== Democratic primary ===
==== Candidates ====
===== Nominee =====
- James N. Robey, chief of the Howard County Police Department

==== Results ====
Democratic primary results
Party	Candidate	Votes	%
Democratic	James N. Robey	14,980	100.0%

=== General election ===
==== Results ====
Howard County Executive election, 1998
Party	Candidate	Votes	%
Democratic	James N. Robey	44,960	55.0%
Republican	Dennis R. Schrader	36,746	44.9%
Write-in		82	0.1%
Democratic gain from Republican			

== Montgomery County ==
=== Democratic primary ===
==== Candidates ====
===== Nominee =====
- Doug Duncan, incumbent county executive

===== Eliminated in primary =====
- Michael K. Brown, postal worker
- Norman Hoffman, urban revitalization consultant and World War II veteran
- Susan C. Rich, animal rights activist

==== Results ====
Democratic primary results
Party	Candidate	Votes	%
Democratic	Doug Duncan (incumbent)	56,233	80.2%
Democratic	Susan C. Rich	9,188	13.1%
Democratic	Michael K. Brown	2,442	3.5%
Democratic	Norman Hoffman	2,262	3.2%

=== Republican primary ===
==== Candidates ====
===== Nominee =====
- James Schneider, real estate agent

==== Results ====
Republican primary results
Party	Candidate	Votes	%
Republican	James Schneider	17,829	100.0%

=== General election ===
==== Results ====
Montgomery County Executive election, 1998
Party	Candidate	Votes	%
Democratic	Doug Duncan (incumbent)	192,525	72.4%
Republican	James Schneider	73,038	27.5%
Write-in		460	0.2%
Democratic hold			

== Prince George's County ==
=== Democratic primary ===
==== Candidates ====
===== Nominee =====
- Wayne Curry, incumbent county executive

===== Eliminated in primary =====
- Randy McRae, accountant and personal injury lawyer

==== Results ====
Democratic primary results
Party	Candidate	Votes	%
Democratic	Wayne Curry (incumbent)	43,018	73.7%
Democratic	Randy McRae	15,361	26.3%

=== General election ===
==== Results ====
Prince George's County Executive election, 1998
Party	Candidate	Votes	%
Democratic	Wayne Curry (incumbent)	145,544	100.0%
Democratic hold			
