= Lorraine Sheehan =

American politician

Lorraine M. Sheehan

63rd Secretary of State of Maryland
- In office 1983–1987
- Governor: Harry Hughes
- Preceded by: Patricia G. Holtz
- Succeeded by: Winfield M. Kelly Jr.

Maryland State House of Delegates, Districts 25 & 26
- In office 1974–1983
- Constituency: Prince George's County, Maryland

Personal details
- Born: Lorraine Marie Cantin; May 2, 1937 Manchester, New Hampshire
- Died: December 19, 2009 (aged 72) Baltimore, Maryland
- Party: Democratic

Lorraine Marie Sheehan (née Cantin; May 2, 1937 – December 19, 2009) was the 63rd Secretary of State of Maryland and a member of the Maryland State House of Delegates, representing part of Prince George's County, Maryland.

Sheehan was born in Manchester, New Hampshire and moved to Maryland in 1965. After her son was diagnosed with disabilities, Sheehan became active in advocating for disability rights.

Sheehan was elected to the Maryland State House of Delegates in 1974, representing the 26th district in Prince George's County. She was re-elected in 1978 and again in 1982, in the new 25th district.

Sheehan was appointed by Governor Harry Hughes to be Secretary of State of Maryland in 1983, serving a four-year term.

After her career in public service, Sheehan moved to Anne Arundel County, Maryland and remained active in disability issues, becoming president of the Arc of the United States. She was inducted into the Maryland Women's Hall of Fame in 2002 and was the 2009 Advocate of the Year for the Anne Arundel Disability Commission.

Sheehan died of pneumonia complicated by cystic fibrosis on December 19, 2009, at Johns Hopkins Hospital.

Political offices
Preceded by Patricia G. Holtz	Secretary of State of Maryland; 1983-1987	Succeeded by Winfield M. Kelly Jr.
