= Betty Mae Kramer Gallery and Music Room =

Art gallery in Silver Spring, Maryland, United States

Coordinates: 38°59′51″N 77°1′28″W

The Betty Mae Kramer Gallery and Music Room is an art gallery and performance space located in the Silver Spring Civic Building in Silver Spring, Maryland. It was established in November 2010.

== History ==
The room is a tribute to Betty Mae Kramer, the former first lady of Montgomery County and wife of Sidney Kramer, who was Montgomery County Executive from 1986 to 1990. The gallery is managed by the Arts and Humanities Council of Montgomery County.

== Exhibits ==
The room showcases works of art from different artists—including photographs, paintings, and sculptures—which are changed every four to five months. The exhibition is usually focused on the work of one or two artists, and includes a biography of the featured artist(s). The gallery is open to the public Monday through Friday from 9 a.m. to 6 p.m.
