= 2002 Maryland county executive elections =

- November 5, 2002

All 6 of Maryland's county executive seats
	Majority party	Minority party
Party	Democratic	Republican
Last election	5	1
Seats won	5	1
Seat change	Steady	Steady
Popular vote	667,762	424,517
Percentage	61.13%	38.87%
Democratic
50–60%
60–70%
70–80%
Republican
60-70%

The Maryland county executive elections of 2002 took place on November 5, 2002, with the primary election occurring on September 10, 2002.

Anne Arundel County, Baltimore County, Harford County, Howard County, Montgomery County, and Prince George's County elected county executives.

== Anne Arundel County ==
=== Democratic primary ===
==== Candidates ====
===== Nominee =====
- Janet S. Owens, incumbent county executive

==== Results ====
Democratic primary results
Party	Candidate	Votes	%
Democratic	Janet S. Owens (incumbent)	33,640	100.0

=== Republican primary ===
==== Candidates ====
===== Nominee =====
- Phillip D. Bissett, state delegate from the 30th district (1991–present)

===== Eliminated in primary =====
- Tom Angelis

==== Results ====
Republican primary results
Party	Candidate	Votes	%
Republican	Phillip D. Bissett	18,496	63.8
Republican	Tom Angelis	10,481	36.2

=== General election ===
==== Results ====
Anne Arundel County executive election, 2002
Party	Candidate	Votes	%
Democratic	Janet S. Owens (incumbent)	89,456	51.8
Republican	Phillip D. Bissett	83,305	48.2

== Baltimore County ==
=== Democratic primary ===
==== Candidates ====
===== Nominee =====
- James T. Smith Jr., former associate judge of the Baltimore County Circuit Court (1985–2001)

===== Eliminated in primary =====
- Joseph Walters Jr.

==== Results ====
Democratic primary results
Party	Candidate	Votes	%
Democratic	James T. Smith Jr.	57,470	75.0
Democratic	Joseph Walters Jr.	19,196	25.0

=== Republican primary ===
==== Candidates ====
===== Nominee =====
- Douglas B. Riley, member of the Baltimore County Council from the 4th district (1998–present)

==== Results ====
Republican primary results
Party	Candidate	Votes	%
Republican	Douglas B. Riley	30,209	100.0

=== General election ===
==== Results ====
Baltimore County executive election, 2002
Party	Candidate	Votes	%
Democratic	James T. Smith Jr.	149,828	55.6
Republican	Douglas B. Riley	119,435	44.4

== Harford County ==
=== Republican primary ===
==== Candidates ====
===== Nominee =====
- James M. Harkins, incumbent county executive

===== Eliminated in primary =====
- Ronald Roz, management systems consultant

==== Results ====
Republican primary results
Party	Candidate	Votes	%
Republican	James M. Harkins (incumbent)	12,932	72.0
Republican	Ronald Roz	5,017	28.0

=== Democratic primary ===
==== Candidates ====
===== Nominee =====
- Paul Gilbert, former director of the Office of Economic Development (1990–1998)

==== Results ====
Democratic primary results
Party	Candidate	Votes	%
Democratic	Paul Gilbert	13,587	100.0

=== General election ===
==== Results ====
Harford County executive election, 2002
Party	Candidate	Votes	%
Republican	James M. Harkins (incumbent)	51,889	61.8
Democratic	Paul Gilbert	31,979	38.1
Write-in		74	0.1

== Howard County ==
=== Democratic primary ===
==== Candidates ====
===== Nominee =====
- James N. Robey, incumbent county executive

==== Results ====
Democratic primary results
Party	Candidate	Votes	%
Democratic	James N. Robey (incumbent)	20,149	100.0

=== Republican primary ===
==== Candidates ====
===== Nominee =====
- Steven H. Adler, businessman

===== Eliminated in primary =====
- Clark J. Schoeffield, telecommunications executive

==== Results ====
Republican primary results
Party	Candidate	Votes	%
Republican	Steven H. Adler	8,410	63.3
Republican	Clark J. Schoeffield	4,874	36.7

=== General election ===
==== Results ====
Howard County executive election, 2002
Party	Candidate	Votes	%
Democratic	James N. Robey (incumbent)	52,918	57.8
Republican	Steven H. Adler	38,630	42.2
Write-in		73	0.1

== Montgomery County ==
=== Democratic primary ===
==== Candidates ====
===== Nominee =====
- Doug Duncan, incumbent county executive

===== Eliminated in primary =====
- William E. Legat

==== Results ====
Democratic primary results
Party	Candidate	Votes	%
Democratic	Doug Duncan (incumbent)	82,583	80.9
Democratic	William E. Legat	19,535	19.1

=== Republican primary ===
==== Candidates ====
===== Nominee =====
- Eric Anderson

===== Eliminated in primary =====
- Jorge Ribas
- Shelly Skolnick

==== Results ====
Republican primary results
Party	Candidate	Votes	%
Republican	Eric Anderson	13,901	52.4
Republican	Jorge Ribas	6,364	24.0
Republican	Shelly Skolnick	6,240	23.5

=== General election ===
==== Results ====
Montgomery County executive election, 2002
Party	Candidate	Votes	%
Democratic	Doug Duncan (incumbent)	217,497	76.3
Republican	Eric Anderson	66,426	23.3
Write-in		1,040	0.4

== Prince George's County ==
=== Democratic primary ===
==== Candidates ====
===== Nominee =====
- Jack B. Johnson, Prince George's County State's Attorney (1995–present)

===== Eliminated in primary =====
- Rushern Baker, state delegate from district 22B (1994–present)
- M. H. Jim Estepp, county councilmember (1994–present)
- C. Anthony Muse, former state delegate from the 26th district (1995–1999)
- Major Riddick, former chief of staff to Governor Parris Glendening

==== Results ====
Democratic primary results
Party	Candidate	Votes	%
Democratic	Jack B. Johnson	39,503	37.0
Democratic	M. H. Jim Estepp	20,748	19.5
Democratic	C. Anthony Muse	19,976	18.7
Democratic	Rushern Baker	13,344	12.5
Democratic	Major Riddick	13,102	12.3

=== Republican primary ===
==== Candidates ====
===== Nominee =====
- Audrey E. Scott, county councilmember (1994–present)

===== Eliminated in primary =====
- J. Mitchell Brown

==== Results ====
Republican primary results
Party	Candidate	Votes	%
Republican	Audrey E. Scott	6,994	74.8
Republican	J. Mitchell Brown	2,358	25.2

=== General election ===
==== Results ====
Prince George's County executive election, 2002
Party	Candidate	Votes	%
Democratic	Jack B. Johnson	126,084	65.9
Republican	Audrey E. Scott	64,832	33.9
Write-in		432	0.2
