= 2006 Maryland county executive elections =

- November 7, 2006

All 7 of Maryland's county executive seats
| | Majority party | Minority party |
|---|---|---|
| Party | Democratic | Republican |
| Last election | 5 | 1 |
| Seats won | 5 | 2 |
| Seat change | Steady | ▲1 |
| Popular vote | 752,193 | 357,575 |
| Percentage | 65.55% | 31.16% |
Democratic
50–60%
60–70%
>90%
Republican
50–60%

The election to choose county executives in Maryland occurred on Tuesday, November 7, 2006. The U.S. House election, 2006, U.S. Senate election, 2006, 2006 Maryland gubernatorial election, 2006 Maryland Senate election and 2006 Maryland House of Delegates election took place on the same day. Seven charter counties elected a county executive: Anne Arundel County, Baltimore County, Harford County, Howard County, Montgomery County, Prince George's County, and Wicomico County. This race coincided with the 2006 election for Maryland county offices.

== Anne Arundel County ==
The general election in Anne Arundel County was between Democratic George F. Johnson IV, a retired police officer from Pasadena, and Republican John R. Leopold, a member of the Maryland House of Delegates.

Anne Arundel County Executive general election
| Party | Candidate | Votes | % |
|---|---|---|---|
| Republican | John R. Leopold | 93,668 | 51.0% |
| Democratic | George F. Johnson, IV | 89,740 | 48.9% |
| Write-In | Various | 176 | 0.1% |
| Total votes | | 183,584 | 100.0% |

== Baltimore County ==
The general election in Baltimore County was between incumbent Democrat James T. Smith Jr. and Republican challenger Clarence Bell, a former police officer.

Baltimore County Executive general election
| Party | Candidate | Votes | % |
|---|---|---|---|
| Democratic | James T. Smith Jr. | 180,063 | 66.3% |
| Republican | Clarence William Bell Jr. | 91,514 | 33.7% |
| Write-In | Various | 199 | 0.1% |
| Total votes | | 271,776 | 100.0% |

== Harford County ==
The general election in Harford County was between incumbent Republican David R. Craig and Democratic challenger Ann C. Helton, a local non-profit executive.

Harford County Executive general election
| Party | Candidate | Votes | % |
|---|---|---|---|
| Republican | David R. Craig | 46,121 | 52.0% |
| Democratic | Ann C. Helton | 42,442 | 47.9% |
| Write-In | Various | 99 | 0.1% |
| Total votes | | 88,662 | 100.0% |

== Howard County ==
The Howard County general election was a three-way race between Democratic candidate Ken Ulman, Republican candidate Christopher J. Merdon, and Independent candidate C. Stephen Wallis. Ulman and Merdon were both members of the Howard County Council, while Wallis was a middle school principal.

Howard County Executive general election
| Party | Candidate | Votes | % |
|---|---|---|---|
| Democratic | Ken Ulman | 54,022 | 52.1% |
| Republican | Christopher J. Merdon | 44,910 | 43.3% |
| Independent | C. Stephen Wallis | 4,701 | 4.5% |
| Write-In | Various | 35 | 0.0% |
| Total votes | | 103,668 | 100.0% |

== Montgomery County ==
The general election in Montgomery County was a three-way race. Democratic candidate Isiah Leggett was a former Montgomery County councilman and law professor at Howard University. Republican candidate Chuck Floyd was a previous candidate for the United States House of Representatives. Independent candidate Robin Ficker was a former member of the Maryland House of Delegates.

Montgomery County Executive general election
| Party | Candidate | Votes | % |
|---|---|---|---|
| Democratic | Ike Leggett | 201,394 | 67.4% |
| Republican | Chuck Floyd | 69,010 | 23.1% |
| Independent | Robin Ficker | 28,063 | 9.4% |
| Write-In | Various | 282 | 0.1% |
| Total votes | | 298,749 | 100.0% |

== Prince George's County ==
In Prince George's county, Democratic incumbent Jack B. Johnson ran unopposed in the general election.

Prince George's County Executive general election
| Party | Candidate | Votes | % |
|---|---|---|---|
| Democratic | Jack Johnson | 169,377 | 97.6% |
| Write-In | Various | 4,180 | 2.4% |
| Total votes | | 173,557 | 100.0% |

== Wicomico County ==
In 2004, Wicomico County voters approved a charter amendment establishing an elected county executive, beginning in 2006. There were three established candidates in this inaugural election. The Democratic candidate was Richard M. Politt Jr, Fruitland, Maryland's City Manager. The nominated Republican candidate was Ronald G. Alessi Sr, a small business owner. Another Republican, Charles J. Jannace III, launched a write-in campaign.

Wicomico County Executive general election
| Party | Candidate | Votes | % |
|---|---|---|---|
| Democratic | Richard M. Pollitt Jr. | 15,155 | 55.0% |
| Republican | Ronald G. Alessi Sr. | 11,632 | 42.2% |
| Republican | Charles J. Jannace III | 720 | 2.6% |
| Write-In | Various | 34 | 0.1% |
| Total votes | | 27,541 | 100.0% |
