= William W. Gullett =

Maryland politician

1st Prince George's County Executive
- In office 1971–1974
- Succeeded by: Winfield Kelly
- Constituency: Prince George's County, Maryland

3rd Mayor of College Park, Maryland
- In office 1963–1969

Personal details
- Born: William Waitman Gullett; October 11, 1922 Springfield, Illinois
- Died: September 24, 2015 (aged 92) Gloversville, New York
- Party: Republican
- Spouse(s): Helen Jaunita Hammons, 1943–1987 (div.); Doris Wilson-Gullett, died 1991; Barbara Yurica, circa 1995–April 2015 (died)
- Children: 4
- Education: Washington University in St. Louis (1948)

William Waitman Gullett (October 11, 1922 – September 24, 2015) served as the first county executive of Prince George's County, Maryland, from 1971 to 1974. He had previously served three terms as the mayor of College Park from 1963 to 1969, a delegate to the Constitutional Convention of Maryland, 1967–68 and a presidential elector for Maryland in 1972.

== Early life ==
Gullett was born in Springfield, Illinois to parents Noah and Clara Virgin (Willett) Gullett. He served in the US Army Air Corps in World War II as a B-17 pilot based in England. Gullett married Helen Jaunita Hammons in Springfield on March 20, 1943. He graduated from Washington University in St. Louis in 1948 with a bachelor's degree in chemistry, after which he settled in Prince George's County with an interest in metallurgy; Gullett held 21 US patents in the area. The couple's first son, William Jr., was born in St. Louis, Missouri, followed by Christopher and twin daughters, Michele and Nicole, in Washington, D.C.

Gullet managed metallurgical projects at Diamond Shamrock and was president of Chicago Development Corp., a metallurgical research firm in Riverdale, Maryland.

== Public service ==
An interest in zoning issues that affected his home in College Park, Maryland influenced Gullett's entry into community affairs. He was elected to the city council in 1961, and became mayor two years later, serving for three terms until 1969.

Gullett was elected as County Executive in a 1971 special election to choose the county's first executive under a new home rule charter, defeating one Republican and five Democratic candidates. Although initially supported by a broad coalition of Republicans and a pro-charter, anti-development group led by local activist Julian C. Holmes, he lost support because of perceived poor performance and constant conflict with the Democratic-controlled County Council. He lost his bid for reelection in 1974 when the Prince George's County Democratic Party swept Republicans from power, defeating every Republican running for state or local office.

On leaving office, Gullett was asked to serve in a USAID mission and did so, working as the assistant director for Management in Haiti from 1982 to 1985.

== Personal life and death ==
Gullett's son, William, was shot and killed on February 16, 1969, while on duty as a young Prince George's County police officer.

After his political service ended, Gullett worked for federal agencies and for the Dynalectron engineering firm. He served as director of licenses and permits in the administration of the second Republican Prince George's County Executive, Lawrence Hogan, in 1979.

Gullett's first marriage ended in divorce in 1987, after which he married Doris Wilson, who had been his administrative assistant while he was county executive. After his second wife died in 1991, Gullett married Barbara Yurica, who died in April 2015 after 20 years of marriage.

Gullett had homes in Vero Beach, Florida and Hope, New York. He died at the age of 92 on September 24, 2015, at a hospital in Gloversville, New York upon cardiorespiratory arrest.

| Preceded by None | Prince George's County, Maryland Executive; 1971–1974 | Succeeded by Winfield M. Kelly Jr. |
