= Edward L. Cochran =

American chemist (1929–2025)

County Executive of Howard County, Maryland
- In office December 1974 – December 1978
- Preceded by: Omar Jones
- Succeeded by: J Hugh Nichols

Chairman of the Howard County Council
- In office 1970–1971

Member of the Howard County Council
- In office 1968–1974

Personal details
- Born: March 18, 1929
- Died: November 16, 2025 (aged 96)
- Party: Democratic Party
- Education: Loyola University Maryland; Duquesne University; University of Notre Dame (PhD)
- Known for: Work with free radicals
- Scientific career
- Fields: Chemistry
- Workplaces: Applied Physics Laboratory
- Thesis: The Photolysis of the Alkyl Iodides in the Liquid Phase

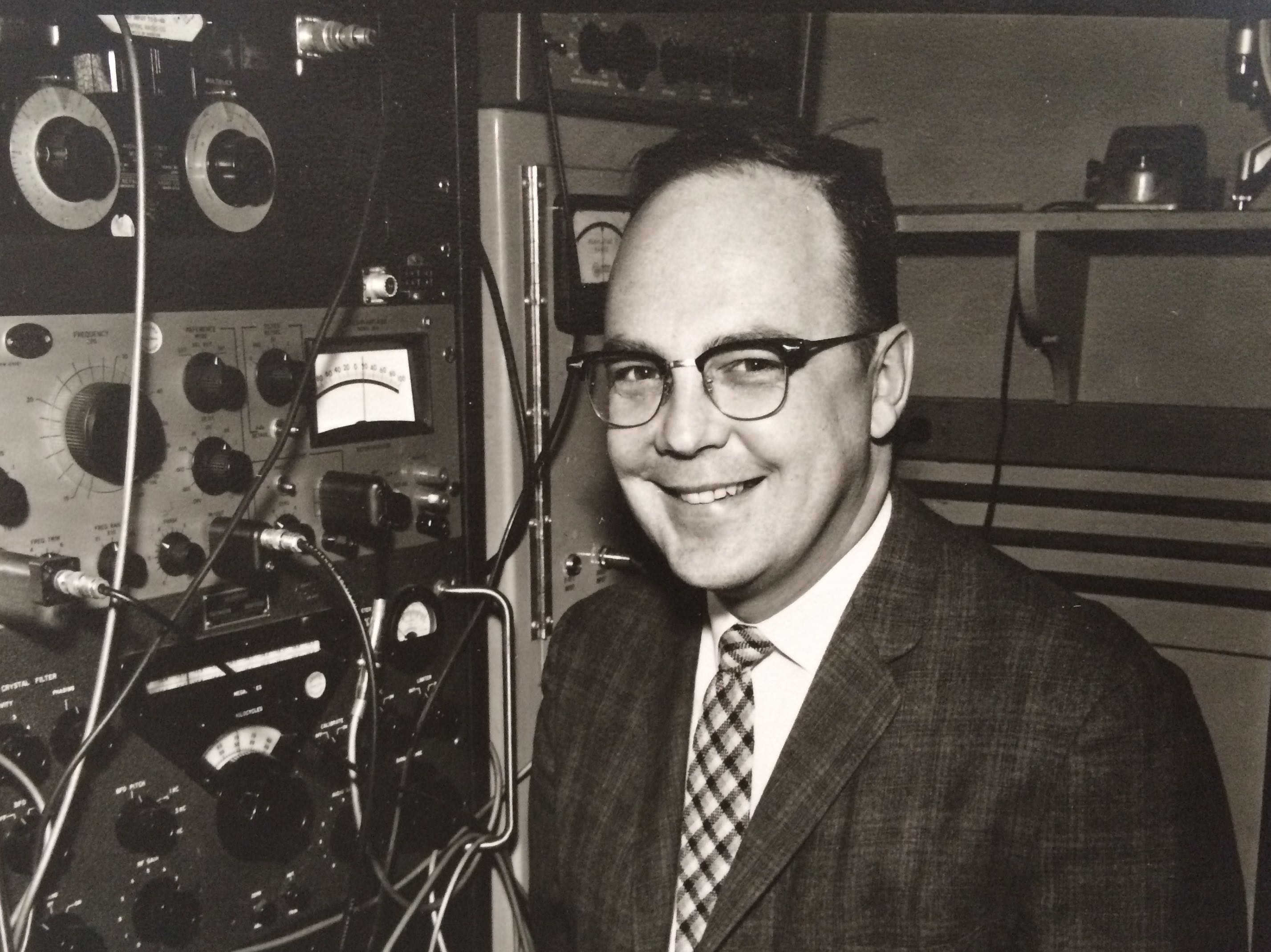
Edward L Cochran Jr. in his laboratory at the Johns Hopkins University Applied Physics Laboratory

Edward Leo Cochran Jr. (March 18, 1929 – November 16, 2025) was an American chemist known for his work with free radicals. In 1956, he moved from Orange, Connecticut, to Clarksville, Maryland, and began his career at Applied Physics Laboratory. He also served as the second county executive of Howard County, Maryland.

== Background ==
Cochran was born on March 18, 1929. He graduated with a B.S. from Loyola University in 1949. He achieved a master's degree in chemistry from Duquesne University in 1951 with a thesis on Basicities of Various Hydrazones. He earned his PhD from the University of Notre Dame with a thesis on the photolysis of the alkyl iodides in the liquid phase.

Cochran worked for the Applied Physics Laboratory as a chemist for most of his career except for the period which he was County Executive of Howard County, Maryland. As chemist, Cochran was part of a team that carried out pioneering studies on the nature of free radicals, along with Chih-Kung Jen, Frank. J. Adrian, Vernon A. Bowers, Samuel Foner, and others, including the description of the Electron Spin Resonance spectra of simple free radicals trapped in solid matrices at cryogenic temperatures. Dozens of free radicals were described for the first time, including hydrogen, deuterium, nitrogen, methane, alkyl, formyl, ethynyl and vinyl, NH^{2} and ND^{2} and cyanogen and Methylene Imino. Their paper on electron spin resonance proved to be one of the most frequently cited APL publications into the 21st century.

Following his term as County Executive, Cochran returned as spokesman for the Applied Physics Laboratory, and learned how to fly at Haysfield Airport. Cochran's family has remained active in Howard County. His son William is an active artist with works proposed for Symphony Woods, his daughter Courtney Watson became a school board member, County Councilperson, and Maryland State Delegate. His daughter Mary Catherine is a founding member of Preservation Howard County, winning the preservationist of the year award for defending and preserving the remaining county historical resources after significant losses to land development approved by the county.

Cochran died on November 16, 2025, at the age of 96.

== Political activity ==
Cochran served part-time as a member of the Howard County Board of Education (1964–1968) becoming chairman and as a Howard County Councilperson (1971–1974). Cochran served as Howard County Executive (1974–1978), running on a slate of Columbia Democratic Club sponsored representatives from Columbia including Ginny Thomas, Lloyd Knowles, Richard Anderson and Ruth U. Keeton. He was a member of the Regional Planning Council (1974–1978) and of the Criminal Justice Information Advisory Board, (1977–1980). Other activities include: Board of Appeals candidate (1980), Howard County Task Force on growth and development (1988), and Howard County Charter Review Commission (2012).

=== Human rights ===
==== Desegregation of Howard County Schools ====
The Howard County School Board had pursued a policy of voluntary integration prior to 1964, which resulted in only a fraction of black students attending white schools. As late as 1964, ten years after Brown v. Board of Education, the board stated that it would not consider forcing integration until 1967, to "allow for a reasonable period of adjustment" to the change. However, in May 1964, as the county experienced increasing growth, the board was expanded to five members, and Cochran was appointed as one of the board's new members. He is credited by Maryland State Senator Robert Kittleman, then the education chairman of Howard County's NAACP chapter, for providing the swing vote on February 9, 1965, to close all-black schools.

===== Human Rights Act =====
In 1975, as County Executive, Dr. Cochran introduced an act establishing an Office of Human Rights and making discrimination on the basis of race, creed, religion, physical or mental handicap, color, sex, national origin, age, occupation, marital status, political opinion, sexual orientation, or personal appearance in the areas of housing, employment, law enforcement, public accommodations, and financing unlawful in Howard County Maryland.

== Awards ==
In 2009, the Howard County Human Rights Commission awarded Cochran the 2009 Human Rights Award. In 2010 he was awarded the James Clark Jr. Medal from Howard County Community College for his role in growing Howard Community College as a member of the board of trustees.
