= Idamae Garrott =

American politician (1916–1999)

Member of the Maryland Senate from the 19th district
- In office 1987–1994
- Succeeded by: Leonard Teitelbaum

Member of the Maryland House of Delegates from the 19th district
- In office 1979–1987 Serving with Helen L. Koss, Lucille Maurer, Joseph E. Owens
- Preceded by: Eugene J. Zander

Montgomery County Council
- In office 1966–1974

Personal details
- Born: Idamae Thomas Riley; December 24, 1916 Washington, D.C.
- Died: June 13, 1999 (aged 82) Silver Spring, Maryland
- Party: Democratic
- Spouse: William Garrott (m. 1948)
- Relatives: 2 children, 2 grandchildren
- Education: Western Maryland College
- Profession: Teacher

Idamae Garrott (December 24, 1916 – June 13, 1999) was an American politician from Silver Spring, Maryland and a member of the Democratic Party. She was a member of the Maryland Senate (1987–1994); the Maryland House of Delegates (1979–1987); and the Montgomery County Council (1966–1974; president, 1971).

Garrott lost the 1974 election for Montgomery County Executive to Republican James P. Gleason and the 1976 Democratic primary race for the House of Representatives to Lanny Davis. She got started in politics in 1952 when she helped found the Montgomery County League of Women Voters, of which she was president from 1962 to 1966.

Garrott was noted for advocating slow growth in development. She was described in the Montgomery Journal as "passionately opposed" to the Inter-County Connector (ICC) and "the godmother of the anti-ICC movement". The executive director of the Humane Society of Baltimore County described her posthumously as "the most prominent advocate of animal protection legislation in Maryland's General Assembly", and as a leader in the effort to make dog fighting illegal in Maryland (the last of the 50 states to ban dog fighting), introducing legislation every year for 10 years. Garrott was also credited with saving the historic Linden Oak in the 1970s by getting the Washington Metro's Red Line rerouted around it.
