= Wayne Curry =

American politician (1951–2014)

5th Executive of Prince George's County
- In office December 1994 – December 2, 2002
- Preceded by: Parris Glendening
- Succeeded by: Jack Johnson
- Constituency: Prince George's County

Personal details
- Born: Wayne Keith Curry; January 6, 1951 Brooklyn, New York City, New York, U.S.
- Died: July 2, 2014 (aged 63) Upper Marlboro, Maryland, U.S.
- Party: Democratic
- Spouse: Sheila Curry
- Relations: Daryl Curry (older brother)
- Children: 2
- Education: Bladensburg High School (1968)
- Alma mater: Western Maryland College (1972)
- Profession: Attorney

Wayne Keith Curry (January 6, 1951 – July 2, 2014) was an American politician. He was elected as the executive for Prince George's County, Maryland in November 1994, and served two terms as the county executive from December 1994 to December 2002. His career encompassed government, civic, and community affairs for more than 20 years.

== Early life and education ==
Curry was born in Brooklyn, New York on January 6, 1951, and grew up in Cheverly, Maryland, where his family was among the first non-white families to integrate into this community in the 1950s. His father was a school teacher, and his mother was a homemaker and later an office secretary. He and his older brother, Daryl Curry, were the first black students to attend Cheverly-Tuxedo Elementary School in 1959. Curry earned his high school diploma from Bladensburg High School in 1968.

In 1972, Curry earned his Bachelor of Arts degree in Psychology from Western Maryland College, where he was president of the freshman class. In 1969, Curry was on the junior varsity basketball team.

Following graduation, he worked as a teacher and director of the Child Daycare Center of Prince George's County. In 1974, Curry took a hiatus from the professional area, and traveled across the United States. He earned money working at truck stops and slept at campsites throughout the country.

== Career ==
From 1975 until 1978, Curry worked in the administration of Prince George's County Executive Winfield Kelly. Kelly was the executive for Prince George's County from 1974 until 1978. Curry's career began as a staffer responsible for writing constituent reply mail. He later went on to serve as community affairs assistant, administrative assistant to the county's Chief Administrative Officer and senior assistant to the executive. While working for Kelly, he also attended law school at night, earning his Juris Doctor degree from the University of Maryland School of Law in 1980, graduating with honors. From 1980 until 1983, he worked as a real estate and development lawyer for the "Michael Companies". In 1984, Curry started his own law practice and became a well-known, successful corporate attorney.

From 1984 to 1992, Curry was General Counsel for "Dimensions Health Corporation", a major healthcare business that operates Prince George's General Hospital Center, the Laurel Regional Hospital, and the Bowie Health Center. In 1994, he returned to the county executive's office and made history when he became the first African American to serve in the County's highest elected office. He served two consecutive terms from December 1994 to December 2, 2002.

Curry served on Governor Robert Ehrlich's 2002 transition team into the Governor's Mansion. Curry was appointed Commissioner to the Maryland Port Commission in 2003 by Gov. Ehrlich, a Republican. He was prominently mentioned in the news media as a speculative candidate for Lieutenant Governor when Ehrlich ran unsuccessfully for re-election in 2006, although Kristen Cox was eventually chosen as Ehrlich's running mate.

== Death ==
Curry died in Upper Marlboro, Maryland on July 2, 2014, from lung cancer at the age of 63.

== Personal life ==
Curry was married to Sheila Curry and had two children.

Preceded by Parris N. Glendening	Prince George's County, Maryland Executive; 1994–2002	Succeeded by Jack B. Johnson
