= Sidney Kramer =

American politician (1925–2022)

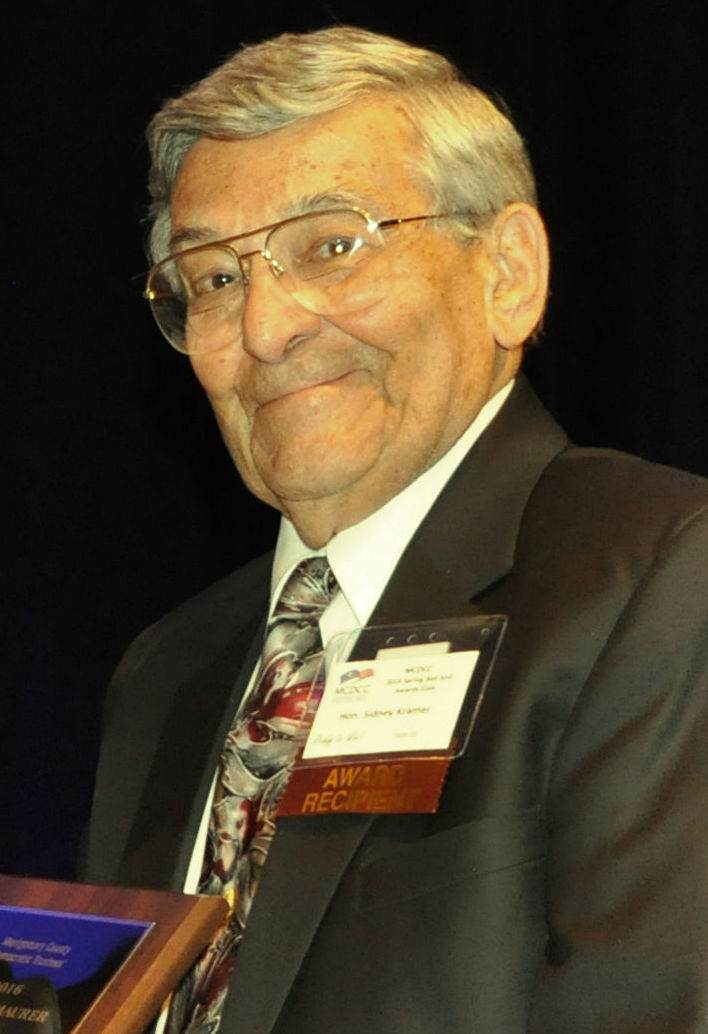
- Kramer in 2016

3rd Montgomery County Executive
- In office December 1, 1986 – December 3, 1990
- Preceded by: Charles W. Gilchrist
- Succeeded by: Neal Potter

Member of the Maryland State Senate; from the 19th district
- In office January 10, 1979 – January 17, 1987
- Preceded by: C. Lawrence Wiser
- Succeeded by: Idamae Garrott

Member of the Montgomery County Council; from the 4th district
- In office December 7, 1970 – December 2, 1974
- Preceded by: James P. Gleason
- Succeeded by: Jane Anne Moore

Personal details
- Born: July 8, 1925 Washington, D.C., U.S.
- Died: May 16, 2022 (aged 96) Rockville, Maryland, U.S.
- Party: Democratic
- Spouse: Betty Mae (m. 1950; died 2010)
- Children: 3, including Benjamin and Rona
- Occupation: Politician, businessman

Sidney Kramer (July 8, 1925 – May 16, 2022) was an American politician in the state of Maryland. He served in the Maryland Senate and as county executive for Montgomery County.

== Early life and education ==
Kramer was born in Washington, D.C., on July 8, 1925. His parents were Jewish and immigrated to the United States from Eastern Europe. He attended Calvin Coolidge High School in his hometown, graduating in 1944. He then earned degrees in chemistry and physics from George Washington University while working full-time. He subsequently moved to Montgomery County, Maryland, and became the proprietor and operator of Automatic Car Washes.

== Career ==
After moving to Montgomery County in 1960, Kramer became active in the local parent-teacher association, as well as the Silver Spring Chamber of Commerce and the Montgomery County Citizens Planning Association. From 1965 to 1966, he served on the Montgomery County Democratic Central Committee. His first bid for a seat in the Montgomery County Council was unsuccessful, but he became elected to the Council four years later in 1970, and he served till 1974. He was credited with persuading the county to distribute grants to local nonprofit institutions for the first time.

During the 1974 US House of Representatives elections, Kramer was the Democratic nominee for Maryland's 8th congressional district against incumbent Republican Gilbert Gude, he lost by a margin of nearly 2-to-1. Kramer was elected to the Maryland Senate in 1978, and he served as Chairperson of the Montgomery County Delegation for eight years. He returned to the County in 1986 and defeated then-County Council Member David Scull in the election to become Montgomery County's third County Executive. During his tenure as county executive, Kramer oversaw the increase in funding for programs helping residents with developmental disabilities, which was previously within the purview of state government. His leadership was characterized as a "relatively low-key, businesslike administration". He was later defeated in the 1990 Democratic primary by Neal Potter, who went on to become the fourth Montgomery County Executive.

== Personal life ==
Kramer married Betty Mae Kerman in 1950. They met at a beach party three-and-a-half years before while he was studying at George Washington University, and remained married until her death in 2010. Together, they had three children. Their daughter, Rona E. Kramer, served as the Secretary of the Maryland Department of Aging from 2015 to 2023 and represented Maryland's 14th District in the State Senate from 2003 to 2011, while their son, Benjamin F. Kramer, represented Maryland's 19th District in the State Senate from 2019. The Betty Mae Kramer Gallery and Music Room is named after his wife.

Kramer died on May 16, 2022, at his home in Rockville, Maryland. He was 96 years old.

Political offices
Preceded by Charles W. Gilchrist	Montgomery County, Maryland Executive; 1986–1990	Succeeded by Neal Potter
