= James T. Smith Jr. =

American politician

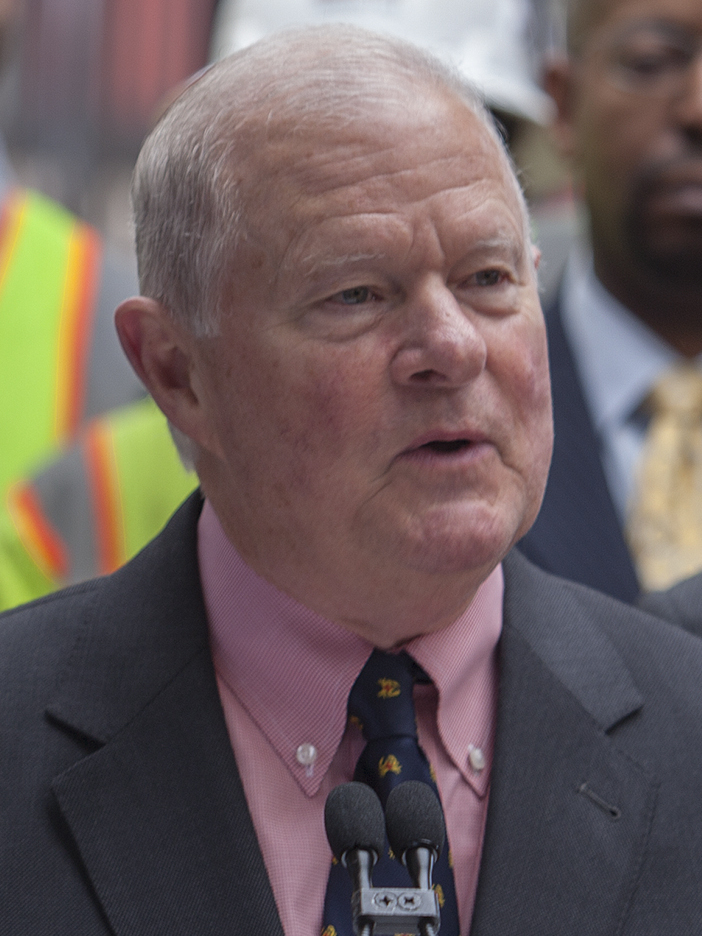
- Smith in 2014

Secretary of Transportation of Maryland
- In office July 15, 2013 – January 21, 2015
- Preceded by: Darrell Mobley
- Succeeded by: Pete K. Rahn

11th Baltimore County Executive
- In office December 2, 2002 – December 6, 2010
- Preceded by: Dutch Ruppersberger
- Succeeded by: Kevin Kamenetz

Associate Judge on the Baltimore County Circuit Court, 3rd Judicial Circuit
- In office 1985–2001

Member of the Baltimore County Council from District 3
- In office 1978–1985
- Preceded by: Clarence E. Ritter
- Succeeded by: Dutch Ruppersberger

Personal details
- Born: February 8, 1942 (age 84)
- Party: Democratic
- Profession: Attorney

James T. Smith Jr. (born February 8, 1942) is an American politician who served as Secretary of Transportation of Maryland under Governor Martin O'Malley from 2013 to 2015. A member of the Democratic Party, he previously served as Baltimore County Executive from 2002 to 2010. He succeeded Dutch Ruppersberger who was elected to the United States House of Representatives; his successor was former County Councilman Kevin B. Kamenetz.

His political career began when he was elected to the Baltimore County Council in 1978, a position he served until he was appointed Associate Judge of the Circuit Court for Baltimore County in 1985. In 2001, Smith resigned as judge to run for County Executive.

After two terms in office, he joined his son's Towson law firm, Smith, Gildea & Schmidt. In May 2013, he left to become Maryland secretary of transportation under Gov. Martin O'Malley. He returned to the law firm in March 2015. In December 2016, he joined the cabinet of Baltimore Mayor Catherine Pugh as chief of strategic alliances, resigning in April 2019.

He has lived in Baltimore County for his entire life. He and his wife Sandy have four children and nine grandchildren.

Preceded by Dutch Ruppersberger	Baltimore County Executive; 2002–2010	Succeeded by Kevin Kamenetz
