= James P. Gleason =

American politician (1921–2008)

1st Montgomery County Executive
- In office 1970–1978
- Preceded by: Office established
- Succeeded by: Charles W. Gilchrist

Member of the Montgomery County Council
- In office 1968–1970

Maryland Constitutional Convention Delegate
- In office 1967–1968

Personal details
- Born: October 14, 1921 Cleveland, Ohio, U.S.
- Died: February 1, 2008 (aged 86) Rockville, Maryland, U.S.
- Party: Republican
- Spouse: Georgette Gleason
- Education: Georgetown University _{(B.A., J.D.)}
- Occupation: Attorney and Local Politician

Military service
- Allegiance: United States
- Branch/service: United States Army
- Years of service: 1941–1945
- Rank: Staff sergeant
- Unit: Army Transportation Corps
- Battles/wars: World War II

James P. Gleason (October 14, 1921 – February 1, 2008) was an American politician who was the first executive of Montgomery County, Maryland and to date the only Republican to hold the office.

== Early life, military service, and education ==
Gleason was born on October 14, 1921, in Cleveland, Ohio, to John and Millicent Gleason. His father worked as an accountant and an auditor, and his job required him to travel frequently. Gleason attended parochial schools in Cleveland, including Cathedral Latin High School. Gleason worked at a bowling alley and as a restaurant busboy after school. After three years of high school, he dropped out to work as a brakeman on the Pennsylvania Railroad's Cleveland–Youngstown route.

Two years later, Gleason joined the United States Army during World War II, where he was assigned to work on supply trains in Iran with the Army Transportation Corps. Gleason earned the rank of staff sergeant.

Georgette E. Smith, a native of Staten Island who had joined WAVES, met Gleason while she was stationed in Cleveland.

As Gleason's discharge date approached, a friend in the Army from Anacostia suggested that Gleason should move to Washington for college. Following his marriage to Georgette and discharge from the Army in October 1945, Gleason took and passed a high school equivalency exam, but his high school refused to honor his test results, denying him the diploma he needed to enroll at Georgetown University. James A. McFadden, the bishop of the Roman Catholic Diocese of Youngstown and a friend of Gleason's mother, wrote a letter on his behalf to Georgetown University, and the school decided to admit him for the spring term of 1946.

Gleason and his wife rented an apartment in Suitland, Maryland, while he attended school. Gleason completed the equivalent of seven years of schooling in four and a half years, and he graduated with honors from Georgetown University Law Center with a combined Bachelor of Arts and Juris Doctor in 1950. Gleason passed Maryland's bar exam in November 1950.

== Political career ==
After briefly working part-time at Georgetown University Law School's library and as a part-time legal assistant at a private law firm, Gleason was hired to serve as a legislative assistant to Senator Richard Nixon in 1951. Two years later, Nixon was elected vice president of the United States, Gleason's position was no longer necessary, and Gleason left.

Gleason worked for Senator William F. Knowland for six years, helping President Dwight D. Eisenhower's bills to be passed through Congress.

=== Senate campaigns ===
==== 1962 ====
In 1962, Gleason ran for the United States Senate seat vacated by the retiring Senator John Marshall Butler. Gleason ran against three other Republicans, namely former Congressman Edward Tylor Miller, real estate broker Harry Simms, and former Hagerstown mayor Herman L. Mills.

In May 1962, the Maryland Republican Party distributed sample ballots, marked "official", that omitted Gleason's name. Gleason said that the Maryland Republican Party violated its principles by openly preferring one Republican candidate over others. Gleason continued to campaign vigorously.

Miller defeated Gleason in the Republican primary election, receiving 49 percent of the vote to Gleason's 39 percent. Following the election, Gleason decided to practice law in Prince George's County.

==== 1964 ====
In 1964, Gleason ran again for the United States Senate, challenging incumbent James Glenn Beall. William A. Albaugh of Mount Rainier and Henry J. Laque, Jr. of North Linthicum also ran in the Republican primary.

Gleason criticized Beall's work in the Senate, saying that Beall had allowed Vice President Lyndon B. Johnson's political advisor Bobby Baker to cover up his acts of bribery and arranging sexual favors in exchange for Congressional votes and government contracts.

Beall defeated Gleason in the Republican primary election, receiving 66 percent of the vote to Gleason's 34 percent.

=== Montgomery County Council ===
When Montgomery County Councilmember David Scull died in office, the Council voted to appoint Gleason to the seat on March 7, 1968. As Scull was a Republican, Gleason returned the Council to four Republicans out of seven seats on the Council.

=== Montgomery County Executive ===
On June 11, 1970, Gleason said that he would run to be the first elected Montgomery County Executive. In the Republican primary election, Gleason ran against Don R. Kendall, the former chairman of the Maryland Republican Party. Gleason won the Republican primary election, receiving 62 percent of the vote to Kendall's 38 percent. In the general election, Gleason faced Democrat William W. Greenhalgh. After recounts were completed, Gleason won the general election with 50.1 percent of the vote to Greenhalgh's 49.9 percent.

On June 19, 1974, Gleason announced that he would run for reelection, saying that there were "many things here that have been not accomplished." Four Democrats ran the office, namely Montgomery County Council members Idamae Garrott and William Sher; and former executive director of the Maryland-National Capital Park and Planning Commission John P. Hewitt. No Republicans filed to challenge Gleason's reelection, and no Republican primary election was held for the office. Garrott won the Democratic primary election and faced Gleason in the general election.

Gleason won the general election, receiving 53 percent of the vote.

Gleason's tenure was marked by an extensive reorganization of Montgomery County's government in 1972 and by conflicts with the Montgomery County Council and his constituents. Loath to compromise, Gleason threatened to withhold Montgomery County funds from Washington Metro, which he had helped plan and which he avidly supported, unless it promised to build two lines into the County. He refused to play party politics, and instead appointed department heads and staff with an even-handedness based on merit.

== Later life and death ==
On February 1, 1978, Gleason announced his retirement from politics to pursue a career of writing fiction.

Gleason died from complications from prostate cancer at his home on September 4, 2008.

== Electoral history ==
=== 1962 ===
1962 United States Senator of Maryland, Republican Party Primary Election
Party	Candidate	Votes	%
Republican	Edward T. Miller	7,464	49
Republican	James P. Gleason	5,940	39
Republican	Harry L. Simms	1,082	7
Republican	Henry J. Laque, Jr.	846	6

=== 1964 ===
1964 United States Senator of Maryland, Republican Party Primary Election
Party	Candidate	Votes	%
Republican	James Glenn Beall	64,293	66
Republican	James P. Gleason	32,409	34

=== 1970 ===
1970 County Executive of Montgomery County, Maryland, Primary Election
Party	Candidate	Votes	%
Republican	James P. Gleason	10,223	62
Republican	Don R. Kendall	6,325	38

1970 County Executive of Montgomery County, Maryland, General Election
Party	Candidate	Votes	%
Republican	James P. Gleason	77,483	50.1
Democratic	William W. Greenhalgh	77,063	49.9

=== 1974 ===
1974 County Executive of Montgomery County, Maryland, General Election
Party	Candidate	Votes	%
Republican	James P. Gleason	86,791	53
Democratic	Idamae Garrott	77,927	47

Political offices
Preceded by Office created	Montgomery County, Maryland Executive; 1970–1978	Succeeded by Charles W. Gilchrist
