= Charles W. Gilchrist =

American politician (1936–1999)

Charles W. "Charlie" Gilchrist

Maryland State Senator, District 17
- In office 1975–1978

Montgomery County Executive
- In office 1978–1986
- Preceded by: James P. Gleason
- Succeeded by: Sidney Kramer

Personal details
- Born: November 12, 1936 Washington D.C., U.S.
- Died: June 24, 1999 (aged 62) Baltimore, Maryland, U.S.
- Party: Democratic
- Occupation: Attorney, local politician, Episcopal priest

Charles W. Gilchrist (November 12, 1936 - June 24, 1999) was an American politician and lawyer. He received degrees from Williams College magna cum laude in 1958 and Harvard Law School in 1961 and was admitted to the Maryland Bar in 1962. He was active in many civic and political organizations, including the D.C. Bar Association and the Democratic Central Committee, and served as a Maryland state senator. In 1978 he was elected as County Executive after the retirement of James P. Gleason. He died on June 24, 1999, of pancreatic cancer at Johns Hopkins Hospital in Baltimore, Maryland.

== Tenure as Montgomery County Executive ==
Gilchrist took office in 1978 after defeating his Republican opponent, Richmond M. Keeney with a margin of more than 3 to 2 and then became the first Democrat to be elected county executive in Montgomery.

Gilchrist's administration was marked by housing problems and a sewer moratorium, pressure to control spending, a reorganization of County government to make it more centralized, and controversies over appointments. He was able to hold property tax raises to the level of or below inflation, and survive questions over his appointments, some of which led to the "Liquorgate" scandal, which he also survived. He was able to expand social services while holding down the size of government, and oversaw the opening of the Ride-On bus system, the Laytonsville landfill, and the incinerator at Dickerson, which had been planned during the Gleason administration.

In 1984 he announced his retirement after the 1986 election to devote his life to the Episcopal priesthood. Sidney Kramer, the candidate whom he supported to succeed him, won over his opponent by a 7 to 4 margin despite being relatively unknown.

== In memoriam ==
The Gilchrist Center for Cultural Diversity in Wheaton, Maryland is named after him. Opened on September 8, 2001, the center provides services to an increasing immigrant population in Montgomery County. On April 21, 2006, the Montgomery County Campus of Johns Hopkins University renamed the main building in honor of Gilchrist citing his role in the creation of the Shady Grove Life Sciences Center where the campus is located.

In 1990, as the associate pastor of St. Margaret's Episcopal Church, Rev. Charles Gilchrist started "Desayuno y Dialogue", a breakfast program for the homeless and poor in the Washington, DC neighborhoods of Dupont Circle, Adams Morgan, Columbia Heights and Mount Pleasant. The program was renamed Charlie's Place in 1999 to honor his hard work and commitment to the poor. Charlie's Place continues today, serving breakfast 4 days a week and providing a myriad of aid.

== Notes ==
Political offices
Preceded by James P. Gleason	Montgomery County, Maryland Executive; 1978–1986	Succeeded by Sidney Kramer
