= Winfield M. Kelly Jr. =

American politician (1935–2023)

64th Secretary of State of Maryland
- In office 1987–1993
- Governor: William Donald Schaefer
- Preceded by: Lorraine Sheehan
- Succeeded by: Tyras S. Athey

2nd Prince George's County Executive
- In office 1974–1978
- Preceded by: William W. Gullett
- Succeeded by: Lawrence Hogan

Personal details
- Born: September 2, 1935 Prince George's County, Maryland, U.S.
- Died: May 19, 2023 (aged 87)
- Party: Democratic

Winfield M. "Win" Kelly Jr. (September 2, 1935 – May 19, 2023) was the County Executive of Prince George's County, Maryland from 1974 to 1978. He previously was a member of the Board of County Commissioners in Prince George's County, 1970–71, the Chair of the County Council in Prince George's County, 1971–74 and was a former president, Business and Industry Advisory Council, Prince George's County School System. He was later the Secretary of State of Maryland in the administration of William Donald Schaefer from 1987 to 1993.

== Early life and education ==
Born in Prince George's County, Kelly grew up in Brentwood and while in his teens owned a restaurant and a chain of mobile food stands. He began college while County Executive, and later graduated from the University of Maryland, College Park and completed graduate studies at Johns Hopkins University.

== Business career ==
Before entering politics, Kelly started a business while in his teens called Winnie's Chuck Wagon. Starting with one truck, he eventually owned a 150-vehicle fleet and employed 500. Kelly sold the business in 1968.

In addition to his political career, Kelly worked for Storer Cable, WMK Inc. and Prime Cable starting in 1979. He served as the President of Prime Cable of Maryland, 1985–88, the chair of the board of directors and chief executive officer of the Dimensions Healthcare System, 1985–2003. Dimensions Healthcare System formed in 1982 as a not-for-profit healthcare system serving county residents and was the largest provider of healthcare in Prince George's County. Kelly also worked as the chair and chief executive officer of the Columbia Bancorp and Columbia Bank, was a former director of the First American Bank of Maryland, and was a former chair and chief executive officer, Suburban Bank.

== Personal life and community service ==
Kelly's family owns an automobile dealership with his name in Clarksville, Maryland.

Political offices
Preceded by William W. Gullett	Prince George's County, Maryland Executive; 1974–1978	Succeeded by Lawrence Hogan
Preceded by Lorraine Sheehan	Secretary of State of Maryland; 1987–1993	Succeeded by Tyras S. Athey
