= J. Hugh Nichols =

American politician (1930-2015)

County Executive of Howard County, Maryland
- In office December 1978 – July 1986
- Preceded by: Edward L. Cochran
- Succeeded by: William E. Eckel

Member of the Maryland House of Delegates
- In office 1971–1978 Serving with Hugh Burgess
- Preceded by: Edwin Warfield III
- Succeeded by: C. Stuart Knudsen
- Constituency: Howard County (1970–1975); District 14B (1975–1978)

Member, Howard County Council
- In office 1968–1970

Personal details
- Born: November 27, 1930 Sprott, Alabama
- Died: December 8, 2015 (aged 85) Maplesville, Alabama
- Party: Democratic Party
- Children: 5
- Education: University of Alabama (AB); American University (MA)

J. Hugh Nichols (November 27, 1930 – December 8, 2015) was an American politician who served as the county executive of Howard County, Maryland from 1978 to 1986.

== Biography ==
Born in Sprott, Alabama, Nichols served in the United States Army. He then received his bachelor's degree in political science and history from University of Alabama in 1957 and his master's degree in public administration from American University in 1967. From 1971 to 1978, Nichols served in the Maryland House of Delegates. Nichols served one term as part of the Howard County Charter Commission after ballots were contested for not having enough signature to qualify. In February 1968, he became a member of the planning commission as Columbia Maryland was undergoing its first phases of construction. He left the post in November 1968 to run for the new position of Howard County Council.

In the 1970s Nichols helped form the Maryland State Lottery. He would later work with the Lottery Board of Louisiana to help form their lottery in the 1990s. Nichols became a Maryland State Delegate from 1971 to 1978. In 1975, he proposed all school instruction materials would need to be screened for content before purchase. In 1976, he was part of a Maryland State delegation to China. In 1978 he was the deputy secretary for State budget and planning.

As Howard County Executive, Nichols vetoed bills that prevented hired council on bond issues from having an interest in the issues recommended.

Nichols later went to work for the firm of Mendez England Associates. In August 1996 Nichols had to leave his assignment in Albania after United States missile strikes against Osama bin Laden raised concerns of retaliation strikes. Six years later, Howard County's Pin-Del-Motel, and Valencia Motel were used by terrorists loyal to Bin Laden prior to the September 11th attacks.

Nichols worked on a free-market economic plan in Poland for eight weeks. He later retired in Maplesville, Alabama. During a 1998 visit to Howard County, he commented that he spent a fair amount of time just to keep from getting lost. "The county has grown faster than I anticipated". He died on December 8, 2015, in Maplesville, Alabama.

== Election history ==
Year	Office	Election	Subject	Party	Votes	%	Opponent	Party	Votes	%	Opponent	Party	Votes	%
1978	Howard County Executive	Primary	J. Hugh Nichols	Democratic	9,317	57%	Edward L. Cochran	Democratic	6,083	37%	Howard Strahler	Democratic	848	
1978	Howard County Executive	General	J. Hugh Nichols	Democratic	23,134		James S. Ansell	Republican	5,070					

Nichols had ambitions to run for Maryland Governor, changing his party affiliation from Democrat to Republican to compete against William Donald Schaefer. He switched after phone calls from vice president George Bush and petitions were submitted. Two days later he took an economic development mission for Howard County in Barcelona, Spain. Working against an overwhelming financial lead, Nichols opted for another career track. In July 1986, Nichols left his office to work for a utility conglomerate: Entergy, in New Orleans, Louisiana.. The County Council chose William E. Eakle to fill his position.

In September 1978, Nichols won the Democratic primary for the office of Howard County Executive, against incumbent Edward L. Cochran by 3000 votes. In the fall of 1985, Nichols converted to the Republican party in an attempt to run for Maryland Governor. The Democratic party insisted that he turn over $3,335 of contributions left over from his $34,796 Democratic campaign fund.
