= O. James Lighthizer =

American politician

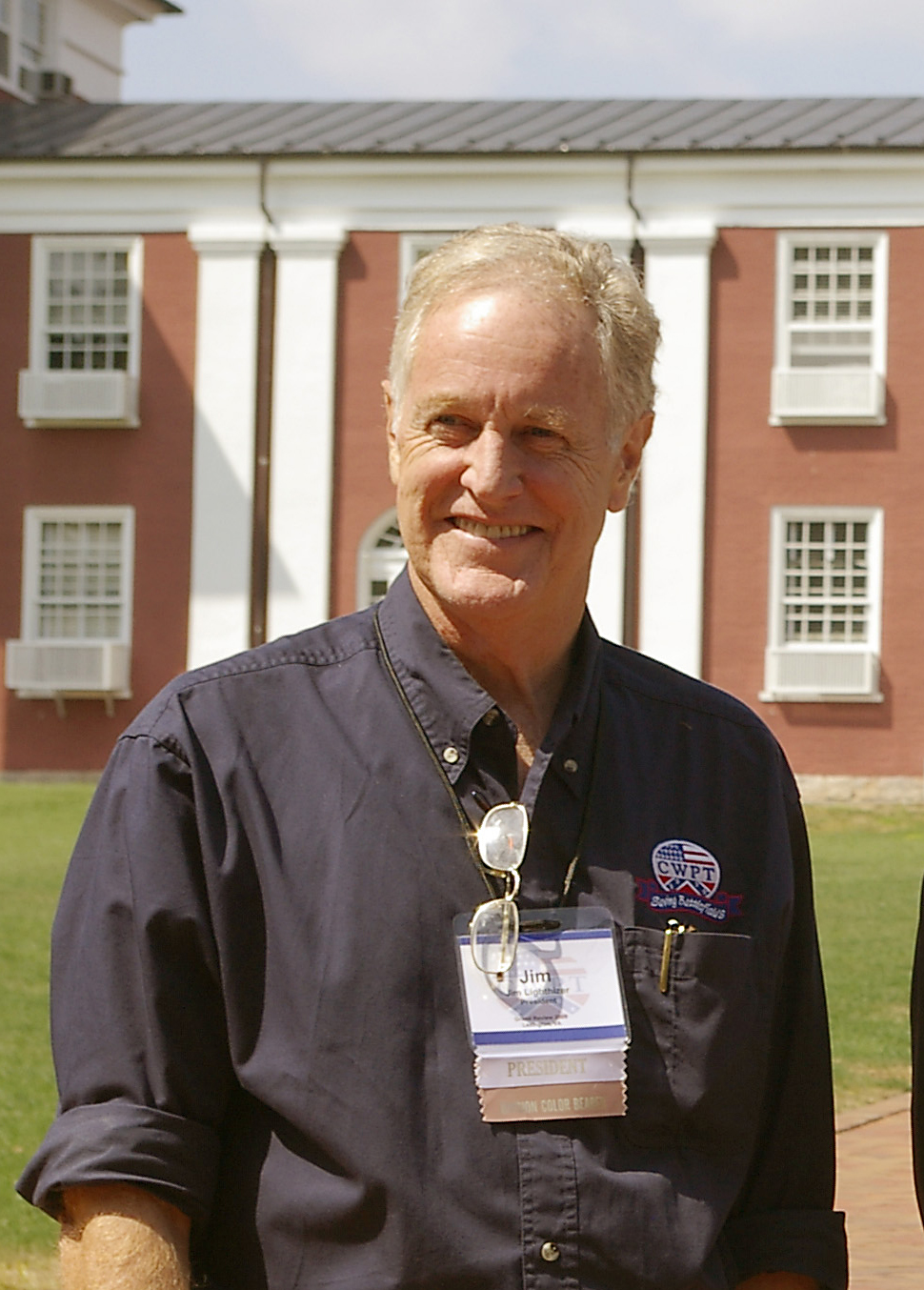
- Lighthizer in 2005

Secretary of the Maryland Department of Transportation
- In office 1991–1995
- Preceded by: Richard H. Trainor
- Succeeded by: David L. Winstead

3rd County Executive of Anne Arundel County
- In office 1982–1990
- Preceded by: Robert A. Pascal
- Succeeded by: Robert R. Neall

Member of the Maryland House of Delegates from the 33rd district
- In office 1979–1982 Serving with Robert R. Neall (R), Elizabeth S. Smith (R)
- Preceded by: Patricia Aiken (D)
- Succeeded by: John G. Gary (R)

Personal details
- Born: March 20, 1946 (age 80) Ashtabula, Ohio, U.S.
- Party: Democratic
- Spouse: Married
- Children: 5
- Relatives: Robert Lighthizer (brother)
- Education: University of Dayton (BA), 1968; Georgetown University (JD), 1975

O. James "Jim" Lighthizer (born March 20, 1946) is an American lawyer, politician, and president emeritus of the American Battlefield Trust, a nonprofit battlefield preservation organization.

== Political career ==
As a Democrat, Lighthizer was a member of the Maryland House of Delegates from 1979 to 1982.

Lighthizer served from 1982 to 1990 as elected County Executive of Anne Arundel County, Maryland and is remembered for being instrumental in the creation of Quiet Waters Park, something he would later say was "the toughest political fight in my 16 years of politics".

After his term ended, Lighthizer served as the Secretary of Transportation to Governor William Donald Schaefer from 1991 to 1995. During his tenure, he developed new programs that matched state fund with federal ISTEA (Intermodal Surface Transportation Efficiency Act) funds to preserve battlefield land. Between 1991 and 2014, the programs Lighthizer initiated and championed protected 8,700 acres on 61 properties near the Antietam National Battlefield, as well as additional acreage at other Maryland battlegrounds.

== Nonprofit career ==
After leaving state service, Lighthizer resumed the private practice of law. As a board member at the Civil War Trust, he helped engineer its merger with the Association for the Preservation of Civil War Sites in 1999 before becoming president of the merged organization. In 2011, the Civil War Preservation Trust was renamed, again becoming simply the Civil War Trust, and in May 2018, the overall organization was renamed American Battlefield Trust, with the Civil War Trust continuing as a division of the umbrella organization along with a second division, the Revolutionary War Trust.

In November 2019, at the 20th anniversary of his presidency, Lighthizer announced that he would retire in 2020. On November 12, 1999, Lighthizer was named president of the newly formed Civil War Preservation Trust, which was created from the merger of two Civil War battlefield preservation organizations, the Association for the Preservation of Civil War Sites, founded in 1987, and the Civil War Trust, founded in 1991. Together, these two organizations had preserved more than 6,000 acres of battlefield land, but had amassed more than $7 million in debt. In 2000, Lighthizer's first full year, the Trust (now named the American Battlefield Trust) retired all of the outstanding debt while also saving 2,421 new acres. In November 2014, the Trust expanded its preservation mission to include not only Civil War battlefields, but those of the American Revolution and the War of 1812. Through 2019, the organization has saved almost 52,000 acres at more than 130 battlefields in 24 states, averaging well over 2,000 acres a year during Lighthizer's 20 years at the helm. Membership grew from about 20,000 in 2000 to more than 47,000 in 2017. From 2000 through 2019, the Trust took in a total of $451 million for battlefield preservation, including $235 million in private donations and $216 million in federal and public funding. In 2019, the Trust received its 10th consecutive four-star rating from Charity Navigator, which evaluates non-profit organizations for fiscal stability, responsibility and performance. Only two percent of non-profits have attained a four-star rating from Charity Navigator for as many as nine consecutive years.

Lighthizer received the National Humanities Medal in a White House ceremony on January 13, 2021. "I was very shocked to receive it," said Lighthizer. "To be recognized by the president of the United States for your own work is extremely gratifying. It's very humbling."

== Personal life ==
Lighthizer is married and the father of five children. Lighthizer's brother, Robert Lighthizer, formerly served as U.S. Trade Representative.

Preceded by Robert A. Pascal	Anne Arundel County Executive; 1982—1990	Succeeded by Robert R. Neall
