= 2006 United States Senate election in Maryland =

- November 7, 2006
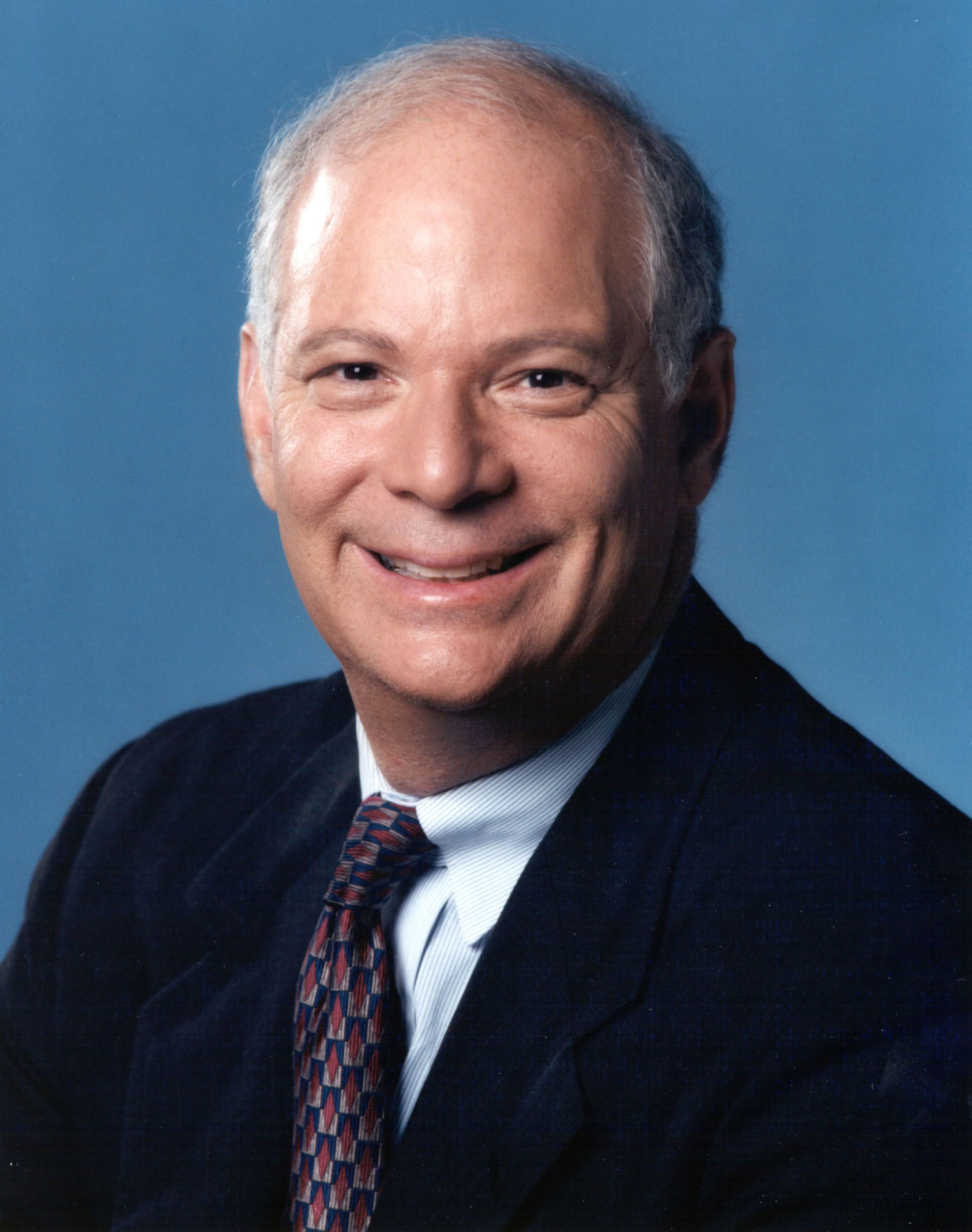

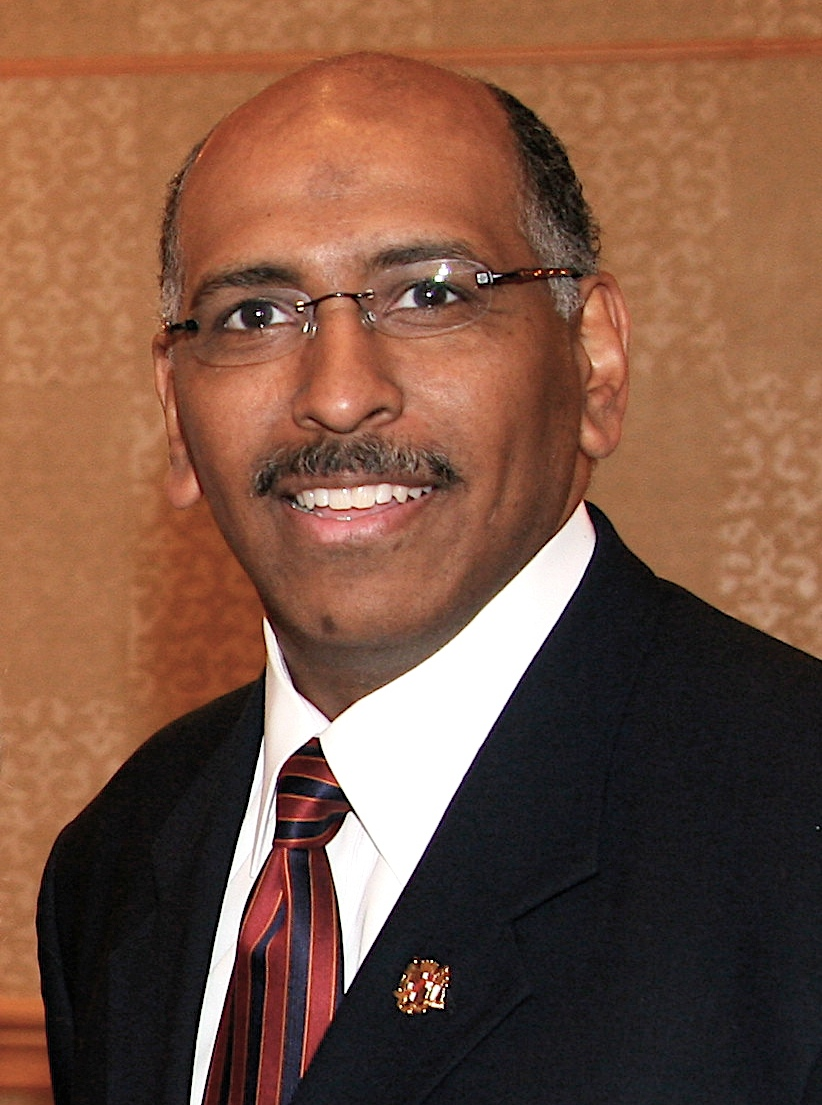
Nominee	Ben Cardin	Michael Steele
Party	Democratic	Republican
Popular vote	965,477	787,182
Percentage	54.21%	44.19%
- County results Cardin: 50–60% 60–70% 70–80% Steele: 50–60% 60–70% 70–80%
U.S. senator before election
Paul Sarbanes
Democratic
Elected U.S. Senator
Ben Cardin
Democratic

The 2006 United States Senate election in Maryland was held Tuesday, November 7, 2006. Incumbent Democrat Paul Sarbanes, Maryland's longest-serving United States senator at the time, decided to retire instead of seeking a sixth term. Democratic nominee Ben Cardin, a U.S. representative, won the open seat, defeating Republican lieutenant governor Michael Steele.

== Democratic primary ==
=== Candidates ===
==== Declared ====
- Benjamin L. Cardin, U.S. representative
- David Dickerson, engineer
- George T. English, economist
- James H. Hutchison, psychiatrist
- Anthony Jaworski
- A. Robert Kaufman, social activist and perennial candidate
- Allan Lichtman, professor at American University
- Thomas McCaskill, physicist
- Kweisi Mfume, former U.S. representative and former president of the NAACP
- Josh Rales, entrepreneur
- Dennis F. Rasmussen, former Baltimore County Executive
- Bob Robinson
- Theresa C. Scaldaferri
- Mike Schaefer, attorney
- Charles Ulysses Smith, activist
- Blaine Taylor, writer
- Joseph Werner, attorney
- Lih Young, perennial candidate

==== Withdrew ====
- Lise Van Susteren, psychiatrist and sister of Greta Van Susteren

==== Declined ====
- Chris Van Hollen, U.S. representative

=== Campaign ===
Kweisi Mfume, a former congressman and NAACP President, was the first to announce for the position, in March 2005. Ben Cardin, then a congressman since 1987, was the only other major candidate until September 2005, when former Baltimore County Executive Dennis F. Rasmussen, American University professor Allan Lichtman, and wealthy Potomac businessman Josh Rales entered the contest. Thirteen other candidates subsequently also entered the primary. As of August 2006, Cardin had raised more than $4.8 million and collected endorsements from a number of Democratic politicians, the AFL–CIO, and The Washington Post; Mfume had raised over $1.2 million and collected endorsements from the Maryland State Teachers Association, Progressive Maryland, former Maryland Governor Parris Glendening, the National Organization for Women, and Maryland Congressmen Elijah Cummings and Al Wynn.

On August 31, 2006, Maryland Public Television (MPT) and the League of Women Voters (LWV) sponsored a debate between the two leading Democratic Primary Candidates. The LWV of Maryland and MPT arbitrarily excluded most of the FEC qualified candidates from the only televised debates in the primary election. There were 18 candidates in this race, only 2, Ben Cardin and Kweisi Mfume, were allowed to debate, despite the strenuous protests of the excluded candidates. Lichtman, Rales, and Rasmussen petitioned MPT and LWV for inclusion in the debate but received no response. On the day of the debate, Lichtman, his wife, and a campaign aide were arrested for trespassing while protesting during the taping of the debate. They were found not guilty on all charges. The judge in the case said it should never have been brought to court and was a gross violation of the parties' constitutional rights.

=== Debates ===
- Complete video of debate, August 31, 2006

=== Polling ===
Source	Date	Ben Cardin	A. Robert Kaufman	Allan Lichtman	Kweisi Mfume	Josh Rales	Dennis F. Rasmussen
The Washington Post	June 25, 2006	26%	2%	4%	33%	0%	4%
The Baltimore Sun	July 17, 2006	32%	1%	1%	28%	1%	1%
Public Opinion Strategies	August 1–2, 2006	31%	—	—	25%	4%	6%
Gonzales Research	August 30, 2006	43%	—	—	30%	6%	—
SurveyUSA	August 31, 2006	38%	—	—	42%	7%	—
SurveyUSA	September 11, 2006	47%	—	—	38%	7%	—

Results by county: Map legend: Cardin—50–60%; Cardin—40–50%; Cardin—30–40%; Mfume—60–70%; Mfume—40–50%

=== Results ===
Democratic primary results
Party	Candidate	Votes	%
Democratic	Benjamin L. Cardin	257,545	43.67
Democratic	Kweisi Mfume	238,957	40.52
Democratic	Josh Rales	30,737	5.21
Democratic	Dennis F. Rasmussen	10,997	1.86
Democratic	Mike Schaefer	7,773	1.32
Democratic	Allan Lichtman	6,919	1.17
Democratic	Theresa C. Scaldaferri	5,081	0.86
Democratic	James H. Hutchinson	4,949	0.84
Democratic	David Dickerson	3,950	0.67
Democratic	A. Robert Kaufman	3,908	0.66
Democratic	Anthony Jaworski	3,486	0.59
Democratic	Thomas McCaskill	3,459	0.59
Democratic	George T. English	2,305	0.39
Democratic	Bob Robinson	2,208	0.37
Democratic	Lih Young	2,039	0.35
Democratic	Blaine Taylor	1,848	0.31
Democratic	Joseph Werner	1,832	0.31
Democratic	Charles Ulysses Smith	1,702	0.29
Total votes		589,695	100

== Republican primary ==
=== Candidates ===
- Ray Bly, small businessman
- Earl S. Gordon
- Thomas J. Hampton, accountant
- John B. Kimble, behavioral researcher
- Edward Raymond Madej
- Daniel Muffoletto, small businessman
- Richard Shawver, activist
- Michael S. Steele, Lieutenant Governor and former chairman of the Maryland Republican Party
- Corrogan R. Vaughn, perennial candidate
- Daniel "The Wig Man" Vovak, ghostwriter and owner of Greenwich Creations

=== Campaign ===
Michael S. Steele was expected to win the Republican primary, and the Baltimore Sun wrote the month before that he faced "only nominal opposition". Among a field of nine other candidates, the only Republican receiving sufficient media coverage was Daniel Vovak.

=== Results ===
Republican primary results
Party	Candidate	Votes	%
Republican	Michael S. Steele	190,790	86.96
Republican	John Kimble	6,280	2.86
Republican	Earl S. Gordon	4,110	1.87
Republican	Daniel "Wig Man" Vovak	4,063	1.85
Republican	Thomas J. Hampton	3,946	1.80
Republican	Corrogan R. Vaughn	2,565	1.17
Republican	Daniel Muffoletto	2,335	1.06
Republican	Richard Shawver	2,298	1.05
Republican	Ray Bly	2,114	0.96
Republican	Edward Raymond Madej	902	0.41
Total votes		219,403	100

== General election ==
=== Candidates ===
- Michael S. Steele (R) – lieutenant governor
- Ben Cardin (D) – U.S. congressman
- Kevin Zeese (G) – (Campaign website). Zeese won the nominations of the Maryland Green Party, the Libertarian Party of Maryland, and the Populist Party of Maryland, the first time all three parties had nominated the same candidate. However, a Maryland law passed in April 2006 prohibited such fusion candidacies, so Zeese, who was a registered Green Party member, was listed on the ballot as only the Green Party candidate.

=== Campaign ===
This was Maryland's first open Senate seat since 1986, when junior Senator Barbara Mikulski was first elected.

Michael Steele won the Republican nomination after facing little competition in the contest for the Republican ticket. With mostly unknown secondary candidates, Steele received 87% of the Republican Primary vote.

Third District Congressional Representative Ben Cardin won the Democratic Party nomination after facing tough competition in the contest for the Democratic ticket from former congressman and NAACP President Kweisi Mfume, businessman Josh Rales, former Baltimore County Executive Dennis F. Rasmussen, and several lesser-known candidates. Cardin received 44% of the Democratic Primary vote to 40% for Mfume, his next closest competitor. All other candidates received percentages only in the single digits.

Kevin Zeese, the nominee for the Green, Populist and Libertarian Parties, was also on the ballot.

Though Steele lost the general election by 10% of the vote, a much wider margin than predicted, his was and remains the best showing for a Republican in a Senate race in Maryland since Charles Mathias, Jr. was re-elected in 1980 with 66.17% of the vote.

=== Controversies ===
Both Steele and Cardin made controversial statements and advertising throughout the campaign.

=== Debates ===
The first debate of the race was held Tuesday, October 3, 2006. All three candidates were present and participated. The evening was hosted by the Baltimore Urban League and moderated by Charles Robinson from Maryland Public Television and Doni Glover from BMORENEWS.

The first televised debate of the campaign was broadcast on News Channel 8 on the program "News Talk". All three candidates participated in the debate, and were moderated by Bruce DePuyt, the host of the program. There was no audience. This debate was widely reported because of the constant bickering between the three candidates, who often interrupted and talked over one another.

Another debate took place between Steele and Cardin on Sunday, October 29, 2006, as a part of the Meet The Press Senatorial debate series. Moderated by Tim Russert, the debate focused primarily on the Iraq War and stem-cell research, amongst other issues.

The three candidates all participated in the final debate of the campaign on Friday, November 3, 2006. The event was sponsored by the Collective Banking Group and held at the First Baptist Church of Glenarden.

Cardin primarily attacked Steele over his close relations with President Bush, including pictures of Bush and Steele in Cardin's TV ads. Steele focused on low taxes, less government spending, free markets and national security.

- Complete video of debate, October 25, 2006
- Complete video of debate, October 29, 2006

=== Predictions ===
Source	Ranking	As of
The Cook Political Report	Tossup	November 6, 2006
Sabato's Crystal Ball	Lean D	November 6, 2006
Rothenberg Political Report	Lean D	November 6, 2006
Real Clear Politics	Tossup	November 6, 2006

=== Polling ===
Source	Date	Ben Cardin (D)	Michael Steele (R)	Kevin Zeese (G)
The Baltimore Sun	April 2005	41%	37%	
The Baltimore Sun	October 25, 2005	47%	38%	
Potomac Survey Research	November 1, 2005	41%	32%	
Rasmussen	November 21, 2005	49%	41%	
Rasmussen	January 13, 2006	40%	45%	
Zogby	January 20, 2006	49%	43%	
Rasmussen	February 22, 2006	49%	35%	
Zogby/The Wall Street Journal	March 31, 2006	49%	39%	
Gonzales Research	April 18, 2006	49%	35%	
Rasmussen	April 25, 2006	45%	35%	
Zogby/The Wall Street Journal	June 21, 2006	51%	40%	
The Washington Post	June 25, 2006	49%	39%	
The Baltimore Sun/Potomac Inc.	July 6–10, 2006	47%	36%	
Rasmussen	July 17, 2006	47%	41%	
Zogby/The Wall Street Journal	July 24, 2006	50%	42%	
Public Opinion Strategies (R)	August 1–2, 2006	43%	35%	
Rasmussen	August 18, 2006	47%	42%	
Zogby/The Wall Street Journal	August 28, 2006	50%	41%	
Gonzales Research	August 30, 2006	44%	39%	
Zogby/The Wall Street Journal	September 10, 2006	49%	40%	
Rasmussen	September 19, 2006	50%	43%	
SurveyUSA	September 20, 2006	47%	48%	4%
The Baltimore Sun/Potomac Inc.	September 25, 2006	51%	40%	
VC Research (R)	September 27–28, 2006	44%	39%	
Zogby/The Wall Street Journal	September 28, 2006	52%	39%	
Mason-Dixon/MSNBC	October 2, 2006	47%	41%	1%
Public Opinion Strategies (R)	October 2–4, 2006	47%	43%	
Reuters/Zogby	October 5, 2006	45%	37%	
USA Today/Gallup	October 6, 2006	54%	39%	
Rasmussen	October 16, 2006	53%	44%	
SurveyUSA	October 18, 2006	46%	46%	3%
VC Research (R)	October 22–23, 2006	41%	39%	
Garin Hart Yang (D)	October 23–24, 2006	52%	40%	
Rasmussen	October 26, 2006	49%	42%	
The Washington Post	October 29, 2006	54%	43%	1%
Reuters/Zogby	November 2, 2006	49%	44%	
The Baltimore Sun/Potomac Inc.	November 2, 2006	49%	43%	2%
SurveyUSA	November 3, 2006	47%	47%	
Mason-Dixon/MSNBC	November 5, 2006	47%	44%	1%
SurveyUSA	November 6, 2006	49%	46%	3%

=== Results ===
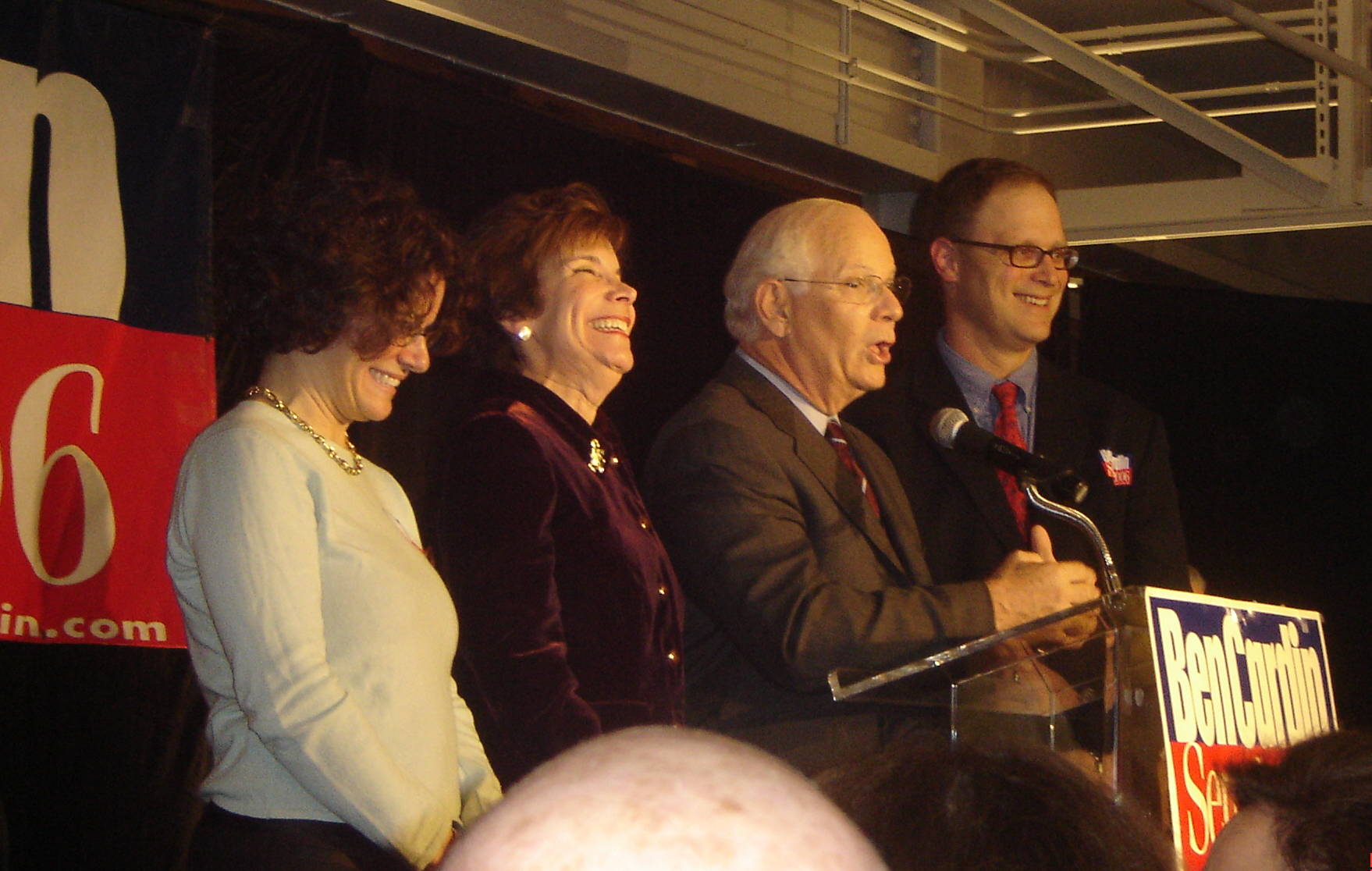
Ben Cardin giving his victory speech following the election

Despite polls days before the election showing the race at a 3% margin, Cardin won by just over 10% with a 178,295-vote margin, although as of 2026, this is the closest a Republican has come to winning a U.S. Senate election in Maryland since Charles Mathias was reelected in 1980. On the same day, incumbent Republican governor Bob Ehrlich lost reelection to Baltimore Mayor Martin O'Malley.

Maryland United States Senate election results, 2006
Party	Candidate	Votes	%	±%
Democratic	Ben Cardin	965,477	54.21%	−8.97
Republican	Michael Steele	787,182	44.19%	+7.46
Green	Kevin Zeese	27,564	1.55%	N/A
Write-in		916	0.05%	N/A
Majority		178,295	10.01%	
Turnout		1,781,139		
Democratic hold		Swing		

==== Results by county ====
County	Ben Cardin Democratic		Michael Steele Republican		Kevin Zeese Green		Write-Ins Independent		Margin		Total Votes Cast
County	#	%	#	%	#	%	#	%	#	%	Total Votes Cast
Allegany	8396	38.87%	12892	59.69%	309	1.43%	2	0.01%	-4496	-20.82%	21599
Anne Arundel	82687	44.17%	101110	54.01%	3331	1.78%	79	0.04%	-18423	-9.84%	187207
Baltimore (City)	112805	74.54%	35185	23.25%	3228	2.13%	120	0.08%	77620	51.29%	151338
Baltimore (County)	145262	51.55%	131291	46.59%	5117	1.82%	140	0.05%	13971	4.96%	281810
Calvert	12687	42.46%	16703	55.90%	481	1.61%	10	0.03%	-4016	-13.44%	29881
Caroline	2860	31.74%	5957	66.12%	192	2.13%	1	0.01%	-3097	-34.37%	9010
Carroll	18893	30.19%	42550	67.99%	1114	1.78%	26	0.04%	-23657	-37.80%	62583
Cecil	11600	40.73%	16296	57.21%	577	2.03%	10	0.04%	-4696	-16.49%	28483
Charles	20938	50.77%	19743	47.87%	539	1.31%	22	0.05%	1195	2.90%	41242
Dorchester	4183	39.28%	6326	59.40%	134	1.26%	7	0.07%	-2143	-20.12%	10650
Frederick	29398	40.38%	42174	57.93%	1196	1.64%	32	0.04%	-12776	-17.55%	72800
Garrett	2686	27.42%	6995	71.42%	110	1.12%	3	0.03%	-4309	-44.00%	9794
Harford	32590	35.82%	56703	62.32%	1664	1.83%	37	0.04%	-24113	-26.50%	90994
Howard	56873	53.90%	47015	44.55%	1577	1.49%	59	0.06%	9858	9.34%	105524
Kent	3484	44.34%	4239	53.95%	134	1.71%	1	0.01%	-755	-9.61%	7858
Montgomery	205264	67.16%	96619	31.61%	3578	1.17%	152	0.05%	108645	35.55%	305613
Prince George's	154798	75.01%	49484	23.98%	1948	0.94%	150	0.07%	105314	51.03%	206380
Queen Anne's	5935	33.03%	11710	65.17%	318	1.77%	6	0.03%	-5775	-32.14%	17969
St. Mary's	11614	40.77%	16381	57.50%	482	1.69%	11	0.04%	-4767	-16.73%	28488
Somerset	2651	39.53%	3953	58.95%	99	1.48%	3	0.04%	-1302	-19.42%	6706
Talbot	5844	37.13%	9686	61.55%	200	1.27%	8	0.05%	-3842	-24.41%	15738
Washington	15921	38.56%	24773	59.99%	582	1.41%	17	0.04%	-8852	-21.44%	41293
Wicomico	10571	37.66%	17074	60.83%	405	1.44%	17	0.06%	-6503	-23.17%	28067
Worcester	7537	37.47%	12326	61.28%	249	1.24%	3	0.01%	-4789	-23.81%	20115
Total	965477	54.33%	783185	44.07%	27564	1.55%	916	0.05%	182292	10.26%	1777142

Counties that flipped from Democratic to Republican

- Allegany (largest municipality: Cumberland)
- Cecil (largest municipality: Elkton)
- Kent (largest municipality: Chestertown)
- St. Mary's (largest municipality: California)
- Worcester (largest municipality: Ocean Pines)
- Anne Arundel (largest municipality: Annapolis)
- Calvert (largest municipality: Chesapeake Beach)
- Dorchester (largest municipality: Cambridge)
- Somerset (largest municipality: Princess Anne)
- Wicomico (largest municipality: Salisbury)

== See also ==
- 2006 United States Senate elections
- 2006 United States elections
