= Thomas E. Dewberry =

American politician (1951–2025)

Speaker pro tempore of the Maryland House of Delegates
- In office 1997 – May 2002

Member of the Maryland House of Delegates from the 43B district
- In office 1997 – May 22, 2002
- Preceded by: Gary R. Alexander
- Succeeded by: Adrienne A. Jones

Member of the Maryland House of Delegates from the 12 district
- In office 1989 – May 22, 2002
- Preceded by: Nancy L. Murphy
- Succeeded by: John F. Quirk

Personal details
- Born: Thomas Edward Dewberry; April 29, 1951 Baltimore, Maryland, U.S.
- Died: December 7, 2025 (aged 74) Baltimore, Maryland, U.S.
- Party: Democratic
- Spouse: Jamie Ann Alley (m. 1974)
- Children: 2
- Parent: Frederick L. Dewberry (father)
- Education: University of Maryland, Baltimore County (BA); University of Baltimore School of Law (JD)
- Occupation: Politician; lawyer; judge

Thomas Edward Dewberry (April 29, 1951 – December 7, 2025) was an American politician and judge from Maryland. He served as a member of the Maryland House of Delegates, representing District 12 from 1990 to 1994 and District 43B from 1995 to 2002.

== Early life ==
Thomas Edward Dewberry was born on April 29, 1951, in Baltimore, Maryland, to Elizabeth and Frederick L. Dewberry. His father was Baltimore County Executive and deputy director of the Maryland Department of Transportation. He attended St. William Of York in Baltimore and graduated from Loyola High School in 1969. Dewberry graduated from the University of Maryland, Baltimore County, in 1973 with a Bachelor of Arts in history. He graduated from the University of Baltimore School of Law in 1977 with a Juris Doctor. He was admitted to the bar in Maryland.

== Career ==
Dewberry worked as a lawyer. He was treasurer of the National Conference of Regulatory Attorneys Convention in 1988.

He was a Democrat. In 1988, Dewberry was a delegate to the 1988 Democratic National Convention. He was appointed a member of the Maryland House of Delegates, representing District 12, in 1989. He represented District 12 from 1989 until 1994. He represented District 43B in the Maryland House of Delegates from 1995 until his resignation on May 22, 2002. He was succeeded by John F. Quirk. He served as speaker pro tempore from 1997 to May 2002.

In 2002, Dewberry became the chief administrative law judge of the Office of Administrative Hearings. He served in that role until 2019.

Dewberry served as president and was a member of the board of directors of Revisions, Inc., a psychosocial rehabilitation center. He served on the board of directors of Historical Old Salem, Inc. He was a member of the Catonsville Chamber of Commerce.

== Personal life and death ==
Dewberry married Jamie Ann Alley, daughter of James O. Alley, on June 15, 1974. They had one son and one daughter. Following their wedding, the Dewberrys lived in Catonsville.

Dewberry died from multiple complications related to heart disease and pneumonia at St. Agnes Hospital, on December 7, 2025, at the age of 74.
