= Michael J. Birmingham =

American politician (died 1964)

1st Executive of Baltimore County
- In office 1956–1958
- Preceded by: Position started
- Succeeded by: Christian H. Kahl

Personal details
- Died: February 2, 1964 (aged 71)
- Resting place: New Cathedral Cemetery
- Political party: Democratic
- Spouse: Catherine Maley (died 1961)
- Children: 2

Michael J. Birmingham (died February 2, 1964) was an American politician from Maryland and a member of the Democratic Party.

== Career ==
Birmingham was police magistrate in Essex, Maryland. In 1950, he joined the Baltimore County commission. He served as the first Baltimore County Executive from 1956 to 1958. He backed Christian H. Kahl, his previous opponent, as its successor. In 1962, he ran again for executive and defeated Kahl in the 1962 primary, but lost to Spiro Agnew in the general election. In 1956, he became a member of the Democratic National Committee.

Birmingham founded a building supply and fuel business. His son succeeded him in the business.

== Personal life ==
Birmingham married Catherine Maley. They had two children, Michael J. Jr. and Thomas J. His wife died in 1961. He lived on Dunglow Road in Dundalk. He died on February 2, 1964, aged 71, at Mercy Hospital in Baltimore. He was buried in New Cathedral Cemetery.
