= Frederick L. Dewberry =

American politician (1921–1990)

Frederick L. Dewberry Jr.

Maryland Secretary of Licensing and Regulations
- In office 1984–1986
- Governor: Harry Hughes
- Preceded by: John J. Corbley
- Succeeded by: William A. Fogle Jr.

5th Baltimore County Executive (Acting)
- In office 1974–1974
- Preceded by: Dale Anderson
- Succeeded by: Ted Venetoulis

Member of the Baltimore County Council from District 4
- In office 1962–1966
- Preceded by: J. Cavendish Darrell
- Succeeded by: George W.H. Pierson

Personal details
- Born: May 9, 1921 Baltimore, Maryland, U.S.
- Died: July 9, 1990 (aged 69) Edmonson Heights, Baltimore, Maryland, U.S.
- Resting place: New Cathedral Cemetery; Baltimore, Maryland, U.S.
- Party: Democratic
- Spouse: Ann Elizabeth Leonard
- Children: 5, including Thomas
- Occupation: Politician; public official; lawyer

Frederick L. Dewberry Jr. (May 9, 1921 – July 9, 1990) was an American politician from Maryland and a member of the Democratic Party. He served as the acting Baltimore County Executive after Dale Anderson was convicted and forced to resign. He has also served as the Deputy Secretary of the Maryland Department of Transportation, Maryland Secretary of Licensing and Regulation and a member of the Baltimore County Council.

== Early life ==
Frederick L. Dewberry Jr. was born on May 9, 1921, in Baltimore, Maryland. He grew up in the Wallbrook section of Baltimore. Dewberry graduated from Loyola High School in 1939. He graduated from Loyola College with a Bachelor of Arts in 1943. He graduated from the University of Baltimore School of Law with a Juris Doctor in 1964. He was admitted to the bar in Maryland in 1966.

== Career ==
Dewberry served in the United States Naval Reserve from 1943 to 1946 as a sonar operator on submarines, reaching the rank of lieutenant. From 1946 to 1967, Dewberry was the vice president and sales manager of Woodcraft Manufacturers Inc., a company in Baltimore that sold wood products.

Dewberry served in the Baltimore County Council from 1962 to 1966; serving as the chair of the council from 1964 to 1966. He served as an intergovernmental relations officer from 1967 to 1973.

Dewberry was a candidate for Baltimore County Executive in 1965. He lost the primary election of 1966 for Baltimore County Executive to Dale Anderson. He served as county development coordinator and was appointed as administrative officer in Baltimore County by Anderson in 1974. Dewberry became the acting Baltimore County Executive in April 1974, following Anderson's resignation. He lost the next primary election to Ted Venetoulis. Dewberry is credited with obtaining federal funding for Oregon Ridge Park. He was executive assistant to Governor Marvin Mandel from 1975 to 1977. He served as executive director of the Regional Planning Council from 1977 to 1979.

From 1979 to July 1984, Dewberry served as the Deputy Secretary of the Maryland Department of Transportation. He was appointed by Governor Harry Hughes as Maryland Secretary of Licensing and Regulation in 1984. He served in that role until November 1986. He was president of the Blind Industries and Services of Maryland from 1986 until his retirement in January 1989. In the last year of his life, Dewberry was appointed by Dennis F. Rasmussen to the Baltimore County Ethics Commission. He had previously served on Rasmussen's Charter Review Commission.

Dewberry worked as a lawyer. He was a member of the advisory board of St. Agnes Hospital from 1970 to 1990.

== Personal life ==
Dewberry married Ann Elizabeth Leonard of Catonsville around 1946. They had five children, Thomas E., Daniel J., Elizabeth Marie, F. Lawrence, Robert G. His son Thomas was a state delegate from Baltimore County.

Dewberry died on July 9, 1990, in Edmondson Heights in Baltimore, Maryland. He was buried at New Cathedral Cemetery.

== Legacy ==
The Frederick L. Dewberry, Jr., Post Office Building at 1001 Frederick Road in Baltimore was named after Dewberry.
