= Roger B. Hayden =

American politician (1945–2019)

9th Baltimore County Executive
- In office 1990–1994
- Preceded by: Dennis F. Rasmussen
- Succeeded by: Dutch Ruppersberger

Member of the Baltimore County Board of Education
- In office May 16, 2017 – October 24, 2019
- In office 1974–1987

President of the Baltimore County Board of Education
- In office 1981–1987

Personal details
- Born: 1945
- Died: October 24, 2019 (aged 74)
- Party: Republican

Roger B. Hayden (1945-2019) was an American politician serving as a member of the Baltimore County Board of Education from 1974 to 1987 and again from 2017 until his death in 2019. A member of the Republican Party, he also served as the 8th Baltimore County Executive from 1990 to 1994.

During Hayden's term as county executive, he was controversial for various decisions made within the county, including the closing of nine of the then 24 branches of Baltimore County Public Library.

== Career ==
As Baltimore County Executive

- Oversaw 610 square mile county with a population of 700,000 and annual budget of $1.3 billion
- Guided county through a recession
- Cumulative reduction in State aid of $160,310,000 was handled without a service impact on operations
- Maintained AAA Bond Rating
- Reduced government spending from an annual average increase of 7.7% to 1.45%
- Right-sized government and reduced central government personnel by 14%
- Increased educational budget in both the operating and capital budgets
- Placed more policemen on the street than ever before by redirecting fiscal resources
- Structured and streamlined a new development process for residential and commercial builders making the county more business friendly
- Evaluated and approved numerous capital construction projects

Appointed by Governor Larry Hogan to the Baltimore County Board of Education 2017

Formerly

- Towson University Associate Vice President of Facilities 2009-2013
- Baltimore Orioles Director of Ballpark Operations 1996-2008
- President, American Lung Association of Maryland
- Board of Education of Baltimore County —1974 to 1986

Political offices
Preceded by Dennis F. Rasmussen	Baltimore County Executive; 1990 – 1994	Succeeded by Dutch Ruppersberger
