= Daniel Vovak =

American writer (1972-2011)

Daniel R. Vovak
- Born: May 15, 1972; Cleveland, Ohio, United States
- Died: May 21, 2011 (aged 39)
- Occupations: Author, satirist
- Writing career
- Pen name: The Wig Man or The Whig Man
- Period: 1995–2011

Daniel "The Wig Man" Vovak (May 15, 1972 – May 21, 2011) was a comedy writer and satirist perhaps best known for his tongue-in-cheek political Republican candidacies and for The Blue Dress, a movie script he wrote about the Monica Lewinsky scandal and which he was reportedly producing as a movie. He also was a ghostwriter. Vovak was an elected member of the Montgomery County Republican Central Committee, serving at-large in Maryland's largest county.

== Background ==
Vovak was raised in Sheffield Lake, a suburb of Cleveland, Ohio. He earned his B.A. at the age of 20 from Baldwin–Wallace College, majoring in Business, Psychology, and Communications. Vovak is the author of a book entitled Will You Run for President?. He lived in Bethesda, Maryland.

== Political and satirical activity ==
Vovak claimed to be the youngest ever Republican candidate (31 years of age) to run for President of the United States when in 2003 he focused on the states of Iowa, Connecticut, Ohio, and Texas. After entering the contest against George W. Bush, Iowa's Governor Tom Vilsack jestfully labeled Vovak "an invader from the East" as Vovak, sporting his white wig, fired a question to the Governor during the Iowa Press Convention. Vovak ran on the campaign theme of "Small Ideas for America" and drove a truck he named "Air Ford One", making people laugh on the campaign trail as he criss-crossed various states. Vovak's presidential campaign essentially ended on January 11, 2004 when he was ejected from the final Democratic presidential debate. On January 19, he was defeated in the Iowa Caucus by the President.

In July 2004, Vovak entered the U.S. Senate contest in Illinois, seeking the Republican nomination after Jack Ryan withdrew. He was interviewed to run against Barack Obama during a special meeting of the Illinois Republican State Central Committee in the 2004 Illinois Senate election. Alan Keyes was picked to run.

On October 13–17, 2005, Vovak organized the "3rd Party National Conference" in Manchester, New Hampshire, which 19 political parties attended.

On September 12, 2006, Vovak was a Republican candidate on the primary ballot in Maryland, receiving 4,063 votes and placing fourth among ten candidates as he lost to Michael Steele.

In November 2009, Vovak ran for Maryland Republican Chairman but lost to Audrey Scott.

On September 14, 2010, Vovak received 31% of the vote in the Republican primary for County Executive of Montgomery County, Maryland.

In his campaigns, Vovak expressed a variety of wry political viewpoints and opinions. For example, Vovak desires to have Tax Day the day before election day to "motivate voters to vote based on their tax bills". He believes the Maryland State Flag is ugly; he counseled leniency towards Paris Hilton's legal troubles, and believes Pluto should be renamed a planet. In his campaign vs. Michael Steele, Vovak hired a psychic campaign manager, joking "My volunteer campaign staff deduced it was less expensive to hire a psychic campaign manager who would curse Michael Steele, than to spend a half million dollars on consultants. Nancy Reagan used a psychic, and I admire her. We got a good deal on a great psychic."

In his 2004 campaign Vovak said that he had "three small ideas" and he didn't know if he "could handle four". His ideas were border control, controlling judges, and canceling the White House's subscription to The New York Times.

Vovak regularly wore a wig in his public appearances. According to his website, Vovak wore the wig because:

1. It is a clever idea to help movie audiences remember him,
2. It saves millions of dollars in advertisements with free media coverage,
3. It evokes the Whig Party roots of the Republican Party and its reliance on the founders' version of the United States Constitution.

Vovak's nickname, "The Wig Man", was bestowed by John DiStaso, senior political reporter at the New Hampshire Union Leader.

== The Blue Dress ==
Vovak wrote and was reportedly producing a movie, The Blue Dress, about the Lewinsky scandal. The screenplay covers the period from June 1995, shortly before Monica Lewinsky was hired as an intern at the White House, through January 1998, after Matt Drudge reported President Bill Clinton's affair and the Lewinsky scandal.

Vovak was casting actors in Washington, D.C., as of October 2008. Paula Jones confirmed she would play herself in the movie and would do an event for the Maryland Republican Party to publicize it.

== Death ==
Vovak died of cancer on May 21, 2011.

== See also ==
- United States Senate election in Maryland, 2010
- Maryland United States Senate election, 2006
