= Ted Venetoulis =

American politician (1934–2021)

Theodore G. Venetoulis

6th Executive of Baltimore County
- In office 1974–1978
- Preceded by: Frederick L. Dewberry (Acting)
- Succeeded by: Donald P. Hutchinson

Personal details
- Born: June 14, 1934
- Died: October 6, 2021 (aged 87)
- Party: Democratic

Theodore G. Venetoulis (June 14, 1934 – October 6, 2021) was an American politician from Maryland and a member of the Democratic Party. He served as the sixth Baltimore County Executive from 1974 to 1978. He ran for Governor of Maryland in 1978 but lost the Democratic primary election to Harry R. Hughes. Hughes went on to win the general election.

Venetoulis previously worked for President John F. Kennedy, President Lyndon B. Johnson, and the presidential campaign of Robert F. Kennedy. He managed the campaign of William Donald Schaefer for Baltimore mayor.

After his political career, Venetoulis continued to be involved in education, journalism, and civic life in Maryland. He owned the Times Publishing Group, and was an advisor to an unsuccessful effort to purchase the Baltimore Sun. Toward the end of his life he helped to found the non-profit institute behind the Baltimore Banner.

Venetoulis taught classes at Goucher College and Johns Hopkins University, and hosted a political show on WBAL TV. He served on various boards and commissions including the board of trustees at Goucher, Maryland Public Broadcasting Commission, Maryland Port Authority, and Columbia Bank, which he helped found.

He was the author of three books: "The House Shall Choose", a history of the presidential elections determined by The House of Representatives; "Against the Urban Wall", a compendium of articles on the urban condition; and a satirical political novel, "Hail to the Cheat".

== Personal life ==
Venetoulis was the son of Greek immigrants. He and his wife Lynn had three children: Teddie, Daki, and Stelios. He was personal friends with Baltimore Mayor Thomas D'Alesandro III and his sister, former Speaker of the House Nancy Pelosi.
