= Donald P. Hutchinson =

American politician

7th Baltimore County Executive
- In office 1978–1986
- Preceded by: Ted Venetoulis
- Succeeded by: Dennis F. Rasmussen

Member of the Maryland State Senate from District 7
- In office 1975–1978

Member of the Maryland House of Delegates from District 5
- In office 1969–1974

Personal details
- Born: December 31, 1945 (age 80) Baltimore, Maryland
- Party: Democratic

Donald P. Hutchinson (born December 31, 1945) is a former Maryland politician who held several positions, including Maryland State Delegate, Maryland State Senator, and he was the 6th elected Baltimore County Executive. A Baltimore native, Don and his wife Peggy, have three adult children and four grandchildren.

== Education ==
Donald Hutchinson attended public schools in Baltimore County. He graduated from Frostburg State University in 1967 with his Bachelor of Science Degree and Honorary Doctorate Degrees from Towson University and the University of Baltimore.

== Career ==
Donald Hutchinson had been active in politics many years before being elected to County Executive. He was a delegate to the Constitutional Convention of Maryland in 1967 and 1968. In 1969 he was first elected to the Maryland House of Delegates, representing District 5 in Baltimore County. He held this position until 1974. During his time as a State Delegate he served as a member of the Constitutional and Administrative Law Committee and from 1970 until 1973 served on the Commission on Young Offenders.

In 1975 Hutchinson was elected to the Maryland State Senate representing District 7, also in Baltimore County. He held this position until 1978. During his time as a State Senator, Hutchinson was on the Constitutional and Public Law Committee and from 1977 until 1978 the Maryland Commission on Intergovernmental Cooperation.

In 1978, Hutchinson ran for and was elected as the 6th County Executive of Baltimore County. He was reelected in 1982.

Outside of his elected position duties, Hutchinson served as a member of many different groups, including the Board of Visitors of Towson State University, which he held from 1981 until 1989. Additionally, he was a member of the Chesapeake Bay Critical Area Commission from 1985 until 1988, the State Board of Education from 1991 until 1992, and the Governor's Commission on Efficiency and Economy in State Government in 1994. Furthermore, he was the Chair of the Governor's Commission on School Funding in 1994, a member of the BWI Airport Commission from 1994 until 1996, and the Governor's Port Land-Use Task Force in 1996.

Hutchinson served as president and CEO of SunTrust Bank, Maryland from 2002 to 2007 where he managed a banking operation with $3 billion in assets and more than 850 employees. Before joining SunTrust, Hutchinson was President of the Greater Baltimore Committee, the preeminent regional business organization of business, nonprofit, educational, and civic leaders. In this capacity, he played a major role in the construction of a new football stadium for the Baltimore Ravens, the revitalization of the Hippodrome Theatre, and the crafting of the management structure for development of an 80-acre biotech park and neighborhood revitalization on the city's east side. Since 2008, Don has been president and CEO of The Maryland Zoo in Baltimore.

Political offices
Preceded by Theodore G. Venetoulis	Baltimore County Executive; 1978–1986	Succeeded by Dennis F. Rasmussen
