= Christian H. Kahl =

American politician

Christian Henry Kahl

2nd Executive of Baltimore County
- In office 1958–1962
- Preceded by: Michael J. Birmingham
- Succeeded by: Spiro T. Agnew

Member of the Board of Baltimore County Commissioners
- In office 1942–1954

Clerk of the Baltimore County Circuit Court
- In office 1941–1942

Personal details
- Party: Democratic

Christian Henry Kahl (July 2, 1905 – August 22, 1985) was an American politician from Maryland and a member of the Democratic Party. He served as the Second Baltimore County Executive from 1958 to 1962. Kahl defeated Gordon G. Power, who was chairman of the Republican Party controlled Baltimore County Council in 1958.
