= Spiro Agnew =

Vice President of the United States from 1969 to 1973

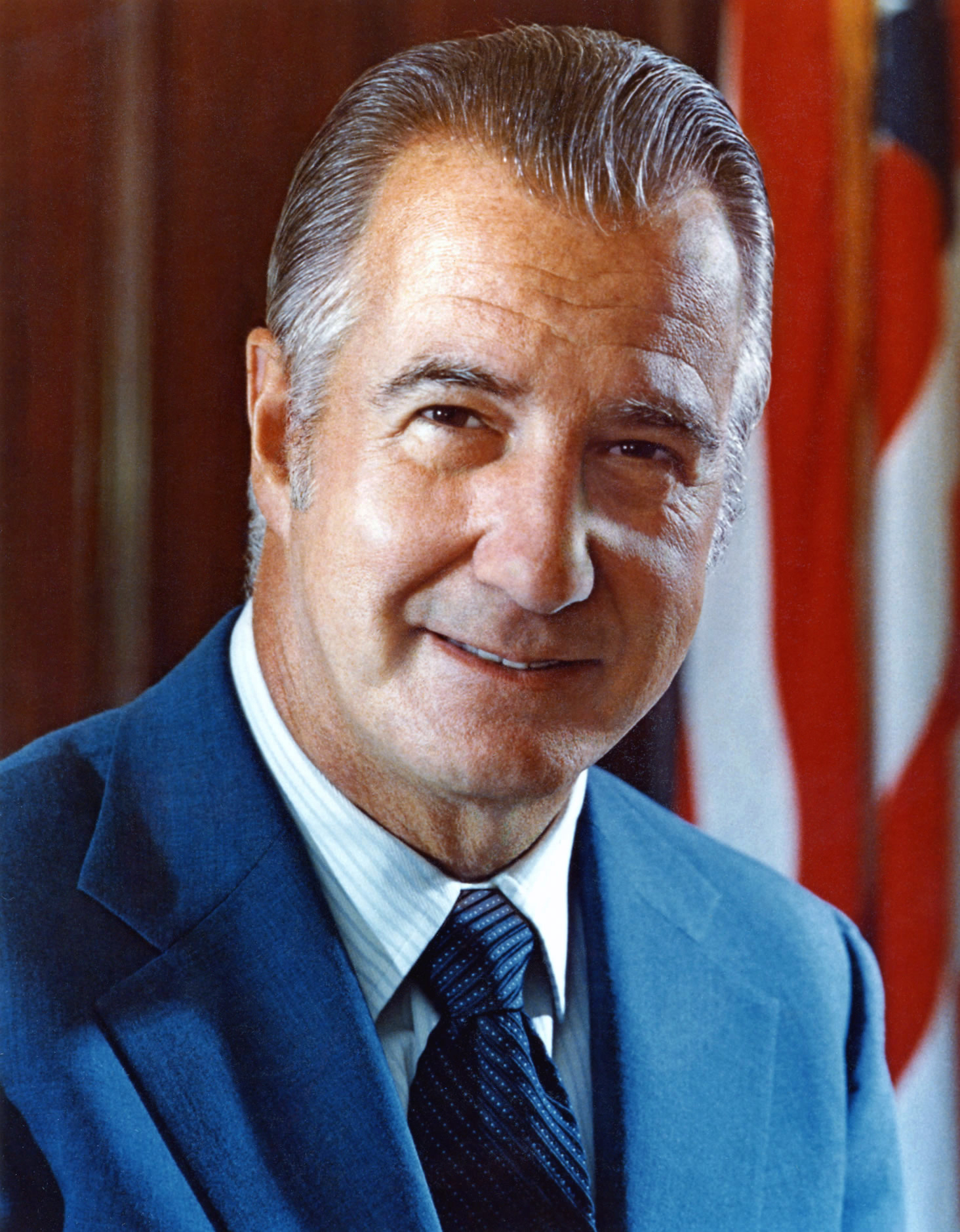
- Official portrait, 1972

39th Vice President of the United States
- In office January 20, 1969 – October 10, 1973
- President: Richard Nixon
- Preceded by: Hubert Humphrey
- Succeeded by: Gerald Ford

55th Governor of Maryland
- In office January 25, 1967 – January 7, 1969
- Preceded by: J. Millard Tawes
- Succeeded by: Marvin Mandel

3rd Executive of Baltimore County
- In office December 6, 1962 – December 8, 1966
- Preceded by: Christian H. Kahl
- Succeeded by: Dale Anderson

Personal details
- Born: Spiro Theodore Agnew; November 9, 1918 Baltimore, Maryland, U.S.
- Died: September 17, 1996 (aged 77) Berlin, Maryland, U.S.
- Resting place: Dulaney Valley Memorial Gardens
- Party: Republican
- Spouse: Judy Judefind (m. 1942)
- Children: 4
- Education: University of Baltimore (LLB)

Military service
- Branch/service: United States Army
- Years of service: 1941–1945
- Rank: Captain
- Commands: Service Company, 54th Armored Infantry Battalion, 10th Armored Division
- Battles/wars: World War II; Ardennes-Alsace; Siege of Bastogne; Central Europe
- Awards: Bronze Star
- Spiro Agnew's voice Agnew on the alleged bias of news networks against Richard Nixon. Recorded November 13, 1969.

Spiro Theodore Agnew (/ˈspɪəroʊ ˈæɡnjuː/; November 9, 1918 – September 17, 1996) was the 39th vice president of the United States, serving from 1969 until his resignation in 1973 under President Richard Nixon. A member of the Republican Party, he served as the 3rd executive of Baltimore County from 1962 to 1966 and the 55th governor of Maryland from 1967 to 1969. He is the second of two vice presidents to resign, the first being John C. Calhoun in 1832.

Agnew was born in Baltimore to a Greek immigrant father and an American mother. He attended Johns Hopkins University and graduated from the University of Baltimore School of Law. He was a campaign aide for U.S. Representative James Devereux in the 1950s, and was appointed to the Baltimore County Board of Zoning Appeals in 1957. In 1962, he was elected Baltimore county executive. In 1966, Agnew was elected governor of Maryland, defeating his Democratic opponent George P. Mahoney and independent candidate Hyman A. Pressman.

At the 1968 Republican National Convention, Nixon asked Agnew to place his name in nomination, and named him as running mate. Agnew's centrist reputation interested Nixon; the law and order stance he had taken in the wake of civil unrest that year appealed to aides such as Pat Buchanan. Agnew made a number of gaffes during the campaign, but his rhetoric pleased many Republicans, and he may have made the difference in several key states. Nixon and Agnew defeated the Democratic ticket of incumbent vice president Hubert Humphrey and his running mate, Senator Edmund Muskie, and American Independent Party candidates George Wallace and Curtis LeMay. As vice president, Agnew was often called upon to attack the administration's enemies. In the years of his vice presidency, Agnew moved to the right, appealing to conservatives who were suspicious of moderate stances taken by Nixon. In the presidential election of 1972, Nixon and Agnew were re-elected for a second term, defeating Senator George McGovern and his running mate Sargent Shriver in one of the largest landslides in American history.

In 1973, Agnew was investigated by the United States Attorney for the District of Maryland on suspicion of criminal conspiracy, bribery, extortion, and tax fraud. Agnew took kickbacks from contractors during his time as Baltimore county executive and governor of Maryland. The payments had continued into his time as vice president, but had nothing to do with the Watergate scandal, in which he was not implicated. After months of maintaining his innocence, Agnew pleaded no contest to a single felony charge of tax evasion and resigned from office. Nixon replaced him with House Republican leader Gerald Ford. Agnew spent the remainder of his life quietly, rarely making public appearances and blaming Zionists for forcing him out of office. He wrote a novel and a memoir, both of which defended his actions. Agnew died at home in 1996 at age 77 of undiagnosed acute leukemia.

== Early life ==
=== Family background ===
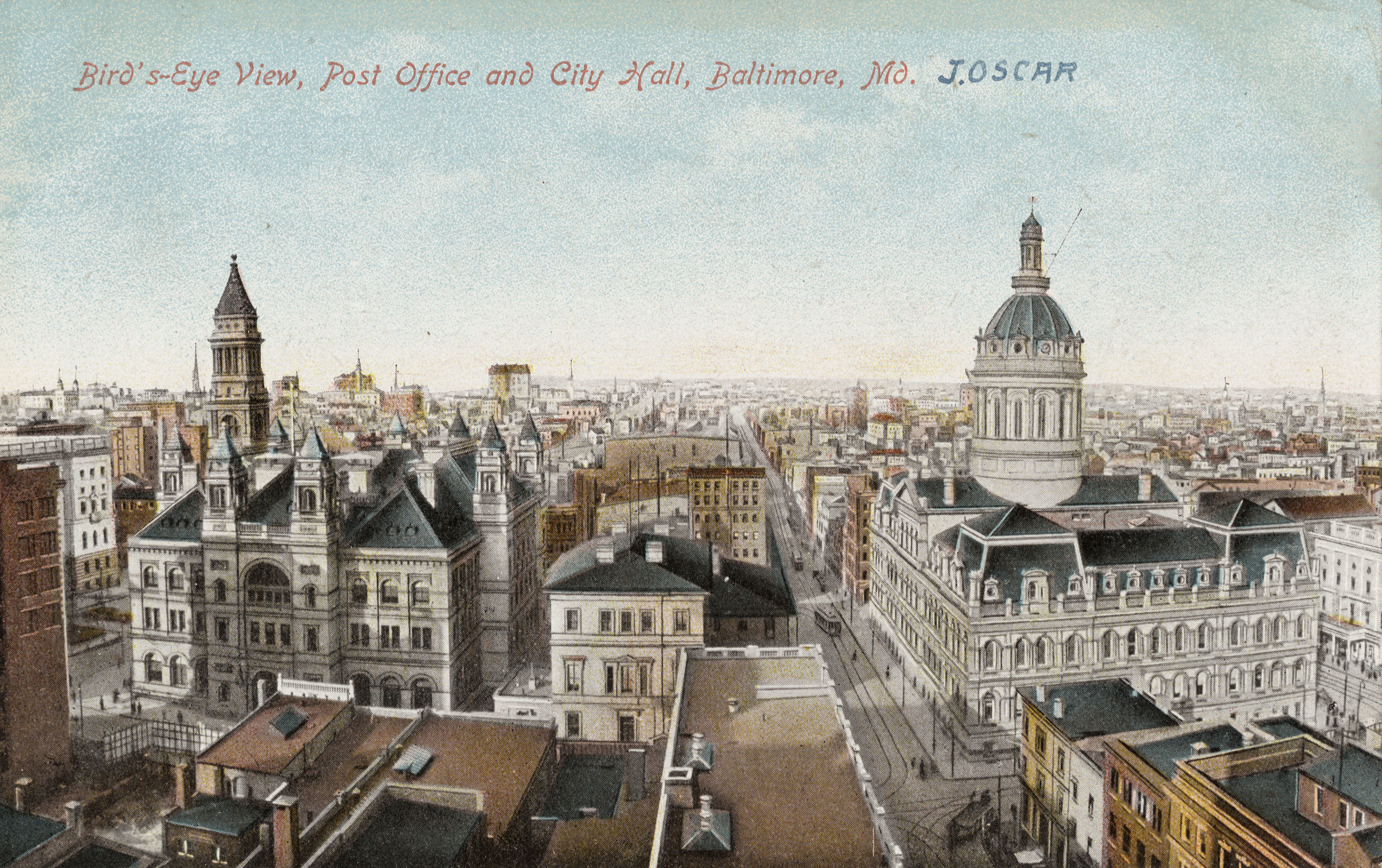
Downtown Baltimore around the time of Agnew's birth

Spiro Agnew's father was born Theophrastos Anagnostopoulos in about 1877, in the Greek town of Gargalianoi, Messenia. The family may have been involved in olive growing and been impoverished during a crisis in the industry in the 1890s. Anagnostopoulos emigrated to the United States in 1897 (some accounts say 1902) and settled in Schenectady, New York, where he changed his name to Theodore Agnew and opened a diner. A passionate self-educator, Agnew maintained a lifelong interest in philosophy; one family member recalled that "if he wasn't reading something to improve his mind, he wouldn't read." Around 1908, he moved to Baltimore, where he purchased a restaurant. Here he met William Pollard, who was the city's federal meat inspector. The two became friends; Pollard and his wife Margaret were regular customers of the restaurant. After Pollard died in April 1917, Agnew and Margaret Pollard began a courtship which led to their marriage on December 12, 1917. Spiro Agnew was born 11 months later, on November 9, 1918.

Margaret Pollard, born Margaret Marian Akers in Bristol, Virginia, in 1883, was the youngest in a family of 10 children. As a young adult she moved to Washington, D.C., and found employment in various government offices before marrying Pollard and moving to Baltimore. The Pollards had one son, Roy, who was 10 years old when Pollard died. After the marriage to Agnew in 1917 and Spiro's birth the following year, the new family settled in a small apartment at 226 West Madison Street, near downtown Baltimore.

=== Childhood, education, early career, and marriage ===
The Enoch Pratt Free Library branch in the Forest Park neighborhood of Baltimore

In accordance with his mother's wishes, the infant Spiro was baptized as an Episcopalian, rather than into the Greek Orthodox Church of his father. Nevertheless, Theodore was the dominant figure within the family, and a strong influence on his son. When in 1969, after his vice presidential inauguration, Baltimore's Greek community endowed a scholarship in Theodore Agnew's name, Spiro Agnew told the gathering: "I am proud to say that I grew up in the light of my father. My beliefs are his." In 1973, he continued to also identify as "an Episcopalian."

During the early 1920s, the Agnews prospered. Theodore acquired a larger restaurant, the Piccadilly, and moved the family to a house in the Forest Park northwest section of the city, where Spiro attended Garrison Junior High School and later Forest Park High School. This period of affluence ended with the crash of 1929, and the restaurant closed. In 1931, the family's savings were wiped out when a local bank failed, forcing them to sell the house and move to a small apartment. Agnew later recalled how his father responded to these misfortunes: "He just shrugged it off and went to work with his hands without complaint." Theodore Agnew sold fruit and vegetables from a roadside stall, while the youthful Spiro helped the family's budget with part-time jobs, delivering groceries and distributing leaflets. As he grew up, Spiro was increasingly influenced by his peers, and began to distance himself from his Greek background. He refused his father's offer to pay for Greek language lessons, and preferred to be known by a nickname, "Ted".

Upon graduation from high school in February 1937, Agnew was accepted at Johns Hopkins University as a chemistry major. After a few months, he found the pressure of the academic work increasingly stressful, and was distracted by the family's continuing financial problems and worries about the international situation, in which war seemed likely. In 1939 he decided that his future lay in law rather than chemistry, left Johns Hopkins and began night classes at the University of Baltimore School of Law. To support himself, he took a day job as an insurance clerk with the Maryland Casualty Company at their Rotunda building on 40th Street in Roland Park.

During the three years Agnew spent at the company he rose to the position of assistant underwriter. At the office, he met a young filing clerk, Elinor Judefind, known as "Judy". She had grown up in the same part of the city as Agnew, but the two had not previously met. They began dating, became engaged, and were married in Baltimore on May 27, 1942. They had four children; Pamela Lee, James Rand, Susan Scott, and Elinor Kimberly.

== War and after ==
=== World War II (1941–1945) ===
By the time of the marriage, Agnew had been drafted into the United States Army. Shortly after the attack on Pearl Harbor in December 1941, he began basic training at Camp Croft in South Carolina. There, he met people from a variety of backgrounds: "I had led a very sheltered life—I became unsheltered very quickly." Eventually, Agnew was sent to the Officer Candidate School at Fort Knox in Kentucky, and on May 24, 1942—three days before his wedding—he was commissioned as a second lieutenant.

After a two-day honeymoon, Agnew returned to Fort Knox. He served there, or at nearby Fort Campbell, for nearly two years in a variety of administrative roles, before being sent to England in March 1944 as part of the pre-D-Day build-up. He remained on standby in Birmingham until late in the year, when he was posted to the 54th Armored Infantry Battalion in France as a replacement officer. After briefly serving as a rifle platoon leader, Agnew commanded the battalion's service company. The battalion became part of Combat Command "B" of the 10th Armored Division, which saw action in the Battle of the Bulge, including the Siege of Bastogne—in all, "thirty-nine days in the hole of the doughnut", as one of Agnew's men put it. Thereafter, the 54th Battalion fought its way into Germany, seeing action at Mannheim, Heidelberg, and Crailsheim, before reaching Garmisch-Partenkirchen in Bavaria as the war concluded. Agnew returned home for discharge in November 1945, having been awarded the Combat Infantryman Badge and the Bronze Star.

=== Postwar years (1945–1956) ===
On return to civilian life, Agnew resumed his legal studies, and secured a job as a law clerk with the Baltimore firm of Smith and Barrett. Until that time, Agnew had been largely non-political; his nominal allegiance had been to the Democratic Party, following his father's beliefs. The firm's senior partner, Lester Barrett, advised Agnew that if he wanted a career in politics, he should become a Republican. There were already many ambitious young Democrats in Baltimore and its suburbs, whereas competent, personable Republicans were scarcer. Agnew took Barrett's advice; on moving with family to the suburb of Lutherville in 1947, Agnew registered as a Republican, though he did not immediately become involved in politics.

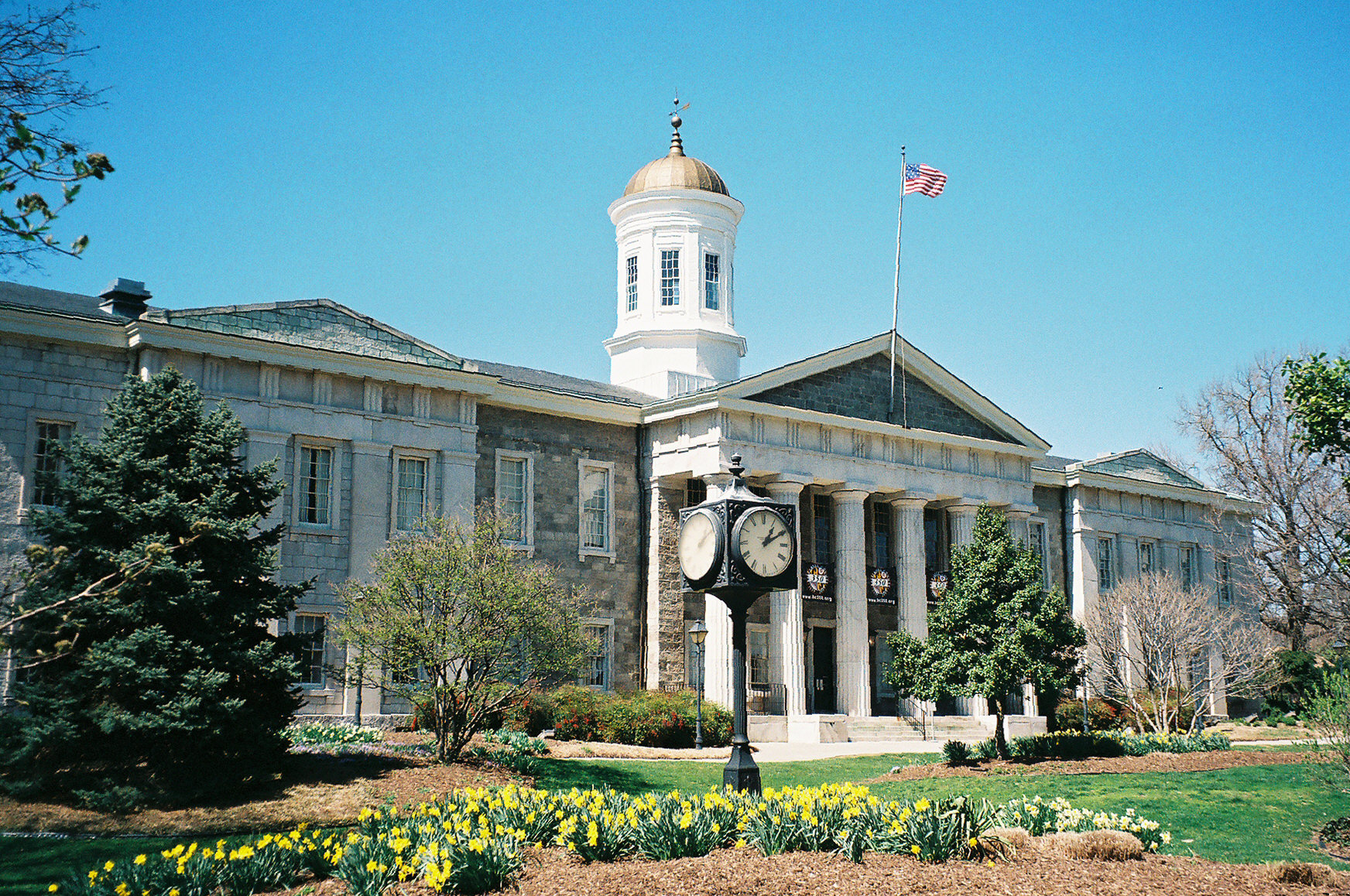
The courthouse at Towson, in Baltimore County, Maryland

In 1947, Agnew graduated with a Bachelor of Laws and passed the bar examination in Maryland. He started a law practice in downtown Baltimore, but was not successful, and took a job as an insurance investigator. A year later, Agnew moved to Schreiber's, a supermarket chain, where his role was store detective. He remained there for four years, a period briefly interrupted in 1951 by a recall to the Army after the outbreak of the Korean War. Agnew resigned from Schreiber's in 1952, and resumed his legal practice, specializing in labor law.

In 1955, Barrett was appointed a judge in Towson, the county seat of Baltimore County. Agnew moved his office there; at the same time, he moved his family from Lutherville to Loch Raven Village, a subdivision of Towson. There, he served as president of the local school district's Parent-Teacher Association, joining Kiwanis, and participating in a range of social and community activities. Historian William Manchester summed up Agnew in those days: "His favorite musician was Lawrence Welk. His leisure interests were all midcult: watching the Baltimore Colts on television, listening to Mantovani, and reading the sort of prose the Reader's Digest liked to condense. He was a lover of order and an almost compulsive conformist."

== Beginnings in public life ==
=== Political awakening ===
In the 1950s, Agnew volunteered for the congressional campaigns of U.S. Representative James Devereux. Agnew made his first bid for political office in 1956, when he sought to be a Republican candidate for Baltimore County Council. He was turned down by local party leaders, but nevertheless campaigned vigorously for the Republican ticket. The election resulted in an unexpected Republican majority on the council, and in recognition for his party work, Agnew was appointed for a one-year term to the county Zoning Board of Appeals at a salary of $3,600 per year. This quasi-judicial post provided an important supplement to his legal practice, and Agnew welcomed the prestige connected with the appointment. In April 1958, he was reappointed to the Board for a full three-year term and became its chairman.

In the November 1960 elections, Agnew decided to seek election to the county circuit court, against the local tradition that sitting judges seeking re-election were not opposed. He was unsuccessful, finishing last of five candidates. This failed attempt raised his profile, and he was regarded by his Democratic opponents as a Republican on the rise. The 1960 elections saw the Democrats win control of the county council, and one of their first actions was to remove Agnew from the Zoning Appeals Board. According to Agnew's biographer, Jules Witcover, "The publicity generated by the Democrats' crude dismissal of Agnew cast him as the honest servant wronged by the machine." Seeking to capitalize on this mood, Agnew asked to be nominated as the Republican candidate in the 1962 U.S. congressional elections, in Maryland's 2nd congressional district. The party chose the more experienced J. Fife Symington, but wanted to take advantage of Agnew's local support. He accepted their invitation to run for county executive, the county's chief executive officer; Democrats had held the executive's post and its predecessor, chairman of the board of county commissioners, since 1895.

Agnew's chances in 1962 were boosted by a feud in the Democratic ranks, as the retired former county executive, Michael Birmingham, fell out with his successor and defeated him in the Democratic primary. By contrast with his elderly opponent, Agnew was able to campaign as a "White Knight" promising change; his program included an anti-discrimination bill requiring public amenities such as parks, bars and restaurants be open to all races, policies that neither Birmingham nor any Maryland Democrat could have introduced at that time without angering supporters. In the November election, despite an intervention by Vice President Lyndon B. Johnson on Birmingham's behalf, Agnew beat his opponent by 78,487 votes to 60,993. When Symington lost to Democrat Clarence Long in his congressional race, Agnew became the highest-ranking Republican in Maryland.

=== County executive ===
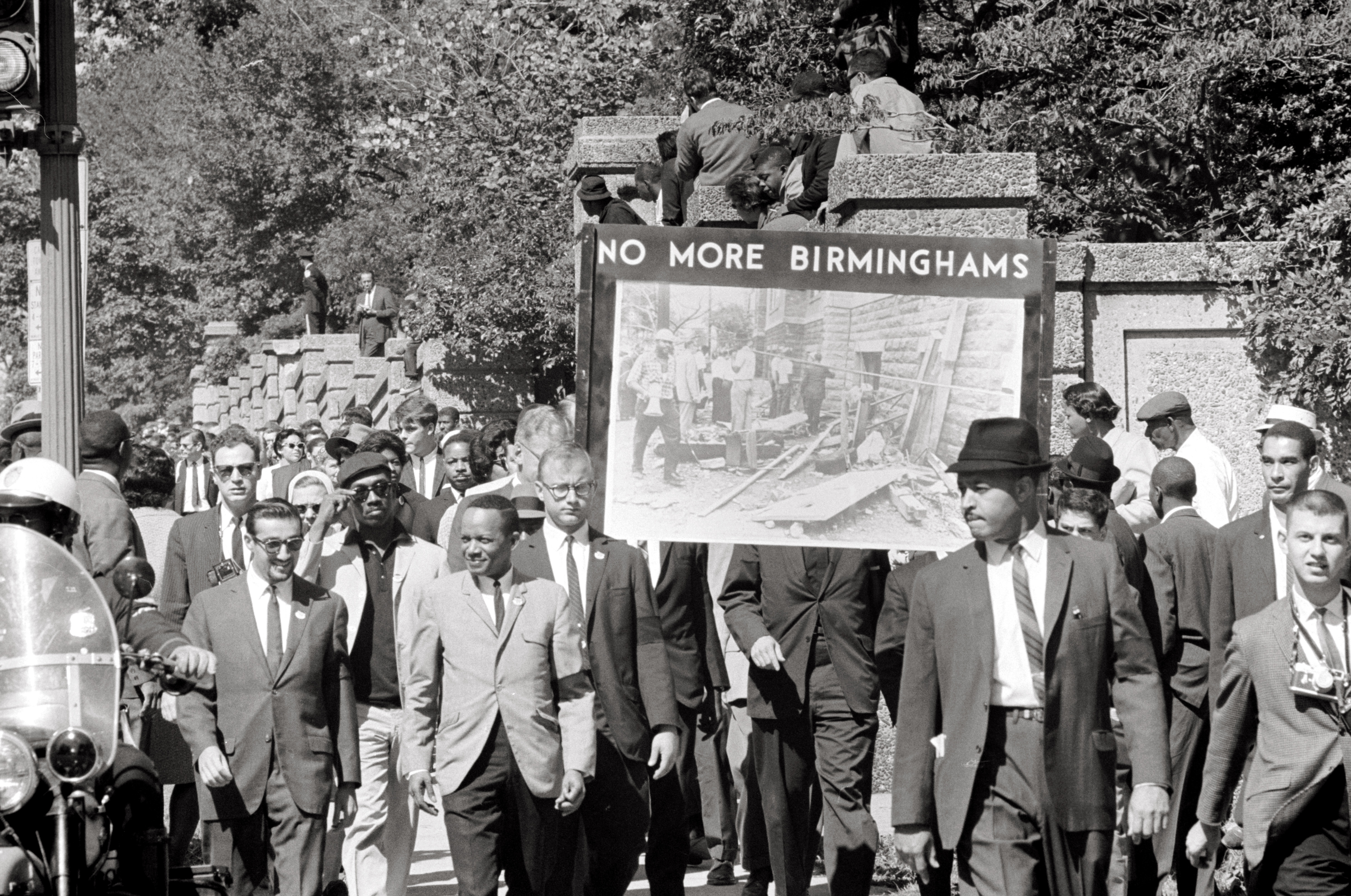
A Civil Rights march, September 1963, protesting the Alabama church bombings. Agnew opposed such marches and demonstrations.

Agnew's four-year term as county executive saw a moderately progressive administration, which included the building of new schools, increases to teachers' salaries, reorganization of the police department, and improvements to the water and sewer systems. His anti-discrimination bill passed, and gave him a reputation as a liberal, but its impact was limited in a county where the population was 97 percent white. His relations with the increasingly militant civil rights movement were sometimes troubled. In a number of desegregation disputes involving private property, Agnew appeared to prioritize law and order, showing a particular aversion to any kind of demonstration. His reaction to the 16th Street Baptist Church bombing in Alabama, in which four children died, was to refuse to attend a memorial service at a Baltimore church, and to denounce a planned demonstration in support of the victims.

As county executive, Agnew was sometimes criticized for being too close to rich and influential businessmen, and was accused of cronyism after bypassing the normal bidding procedures and designating three of his Republican friends as the county's insurance brokers of record, ensuring them large commissions. Agnew's standard reaction to such criticisms was to display moral indignation, denounce his opponents' "outrageous distortions", deny any wrongdoing and insist on his personal integrity; tactics which, Cohen and Witcover note, were to be seen again as he defended himself against the corruption allegations that ended his vice presidency.

In the 1964 presidential election, Agnew was opposed to the Republican frontrunner, the conservative Barry Goldwater, initially supporting the moderate California senator Thomas Kuchel, a candidacy that, Witcover remarks, "died stillborn". After the failure of moderate Pennsylvania Governor William Scranton's candidacy at the party convention, Agnew gave his reluctant support to Goldwater, but privately opined that the choice of so extremist a candidate had cost the Republicans any chance of victory.

== Governor of Maryland (1967–1969) ==
=== Election 1966 ===
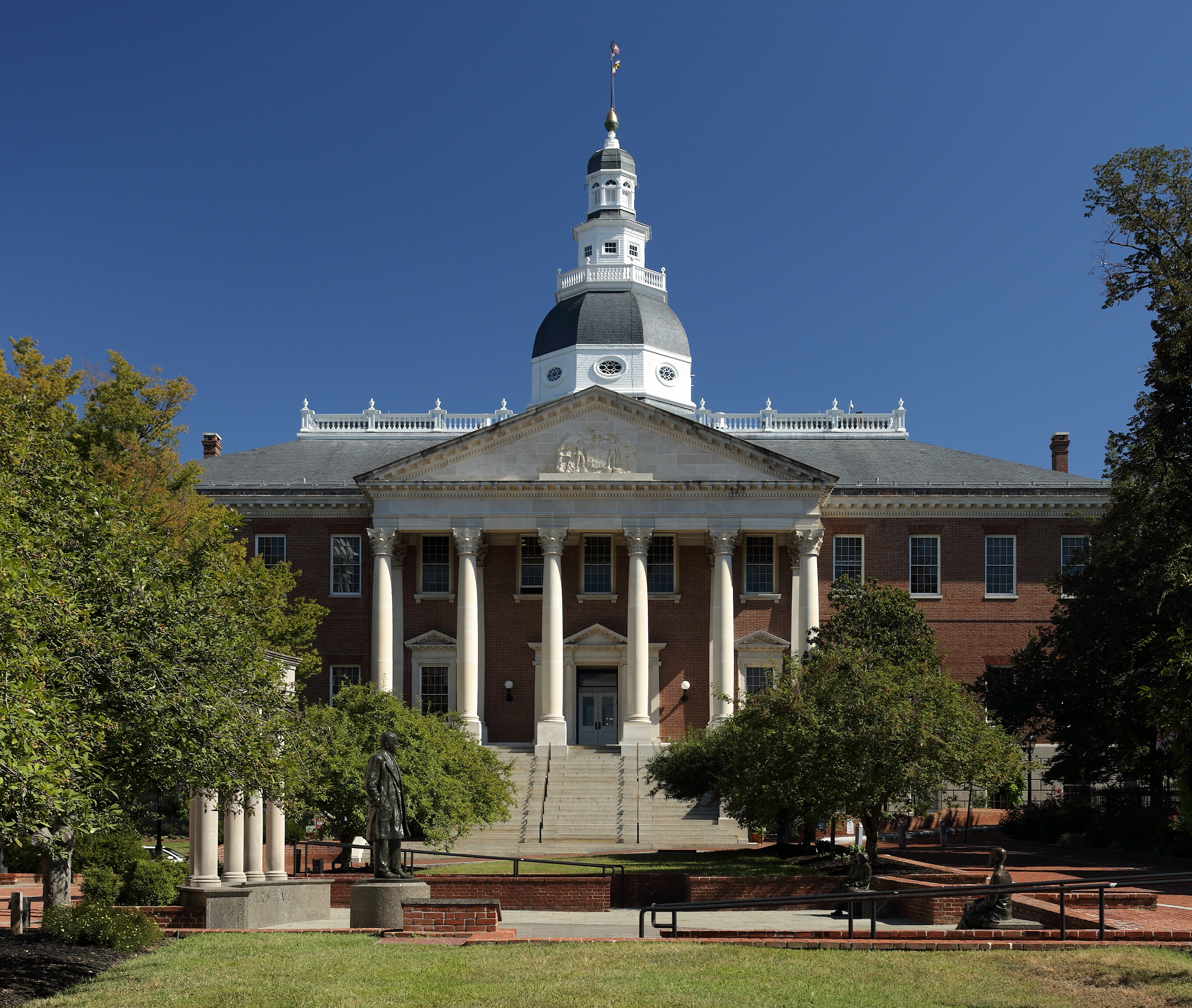
The Maryland State House, Annapolis, the seat of the state government

As his four-year term as executive neared its end, Agnew knew that his chances of re-election were slim, given that the county's Democrats had healed their rift. Instead, in 1966 he sought the Republican nomination for governor, and with the backing of party leaders won the April primary by a wide margin.

In the Democratic party, three candidates—a moderate, a liberal, and an outright segregationist—battled for their party's gubernatorial nomination, which to general surprise was won by the segregationist George P. Mahoney, a perennially unsuccessful candidate for office. Mahoney's candidacy split his party, provoking a third-party candidate, Comptroller of Baltimore City Hyman A. Pressman. In Montgomery County, the state's wealthiest area, a "Democrats for Agnew" organization flourished, and liberals statewide flocked to the Agnew standard. Mahoney, a fierce opponent of integrated housing, exploited racial tensions with the slogan: "Your Home is Your Castle. Protect it!" Agnew painted him as the candidate of the Ku Klux Klan, and said voters must choose "between the bright, pure, courageous flame of righteousness and the fiery cross". In the November election Agnew, helped by 70 percent of the black vote, beat Mahoney by 455,318 votes (49.5 percent) to 373,543, with Pressman taking 90,899 votes.

Results of the 1966 election, by county (Agnew: red, Mahoney: blue)

After the campaign, it emerged that Agnew had failed to report three alleged attempts to bribe him that had been made on behalf of the slot-machine industry, involving sums of $20,000, $75,000, and $200,000, if he would promise not to veto legislation keeping the machines legal in Southern Maryland. He justified his silence on the grounds that no actual offer had been made: "Nobody sat down in front of me with a suitcase of money." Agnew was also criticized over his part-ownership of land close to the site of a planned, but never-built second bridge over Chesapeake Bay. Opponents claimed a conflict of interest, since some of Agnew's partners in the venture were simultaneously involved in business deals with the county. Agnew denied any conflict or impropriety, saying that the property involved was outside Baltimore County and his jurisdiction. Nevertheless, he sold his interest.

=== In office ===
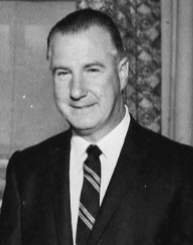
Agnew as governor

Agnew's term as governor was marked by an agenda which included tax reform, clean water regulations, and the repeal of laws against interracial marriage. Community health programs were expanded, as were higher educational and employment opportunities for those on low incomes. Steps were taken towards ending segregation in schools. Agnew's fair housing legislation was limited, applying only to new projects above a certain size. These were the first such laws passed south of the Mason–Dixon line. Agnew's attempt to adopt a new state constitution was rejected by the voters in a referendum.

For the most part, Agnew remained somewhat aloof from the state legislature, preferring the company of businessmen. Some of these had been associates in his county executive days, such as Lester Matz and Walter Jones, who had been among the first to encourage him to seek the governorship. Agnew's close ties to the business community were noted by officials in the state capital of Annapolis: "There always seemed to be people around him who were in business." Some suspected that, while not himself corrupt, he "allowed himself to be used by the people around him."

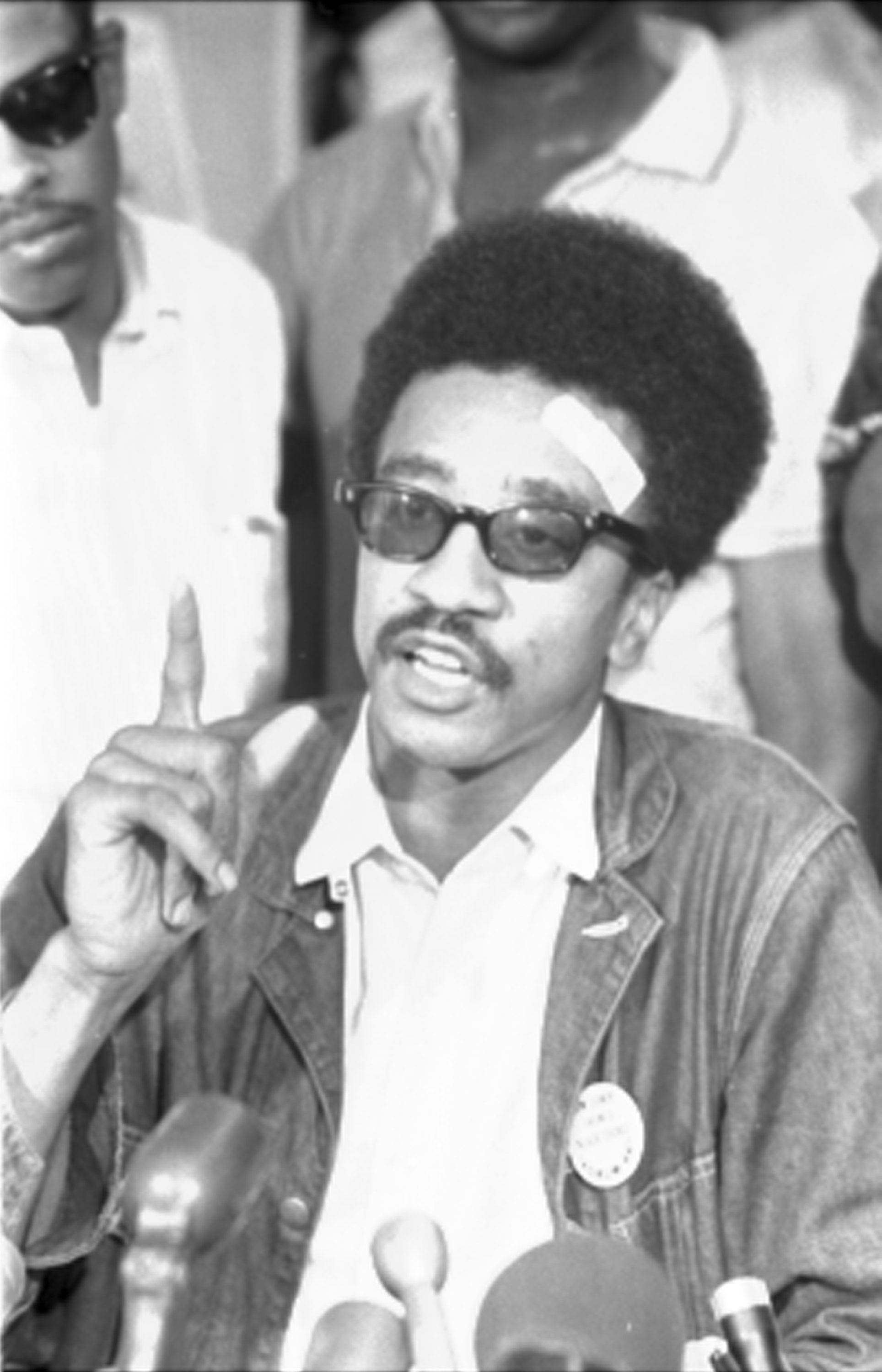
H. Rap Brown, militant student activist whose speech in Cambridge, Maryland, sparked riots there

Agnew publicly supported civil rights, but deplored the militant tactics used by some black leaders. During the 1966 election, his record had won him the endorsement of Roy Wilkins, leader of the National Association for the Advancement of Colored People (NAACP). In mid-1967, racial tension was rising nationally, fueled by black discontent and an increasingly assertive civil rights leadership. Several cities exploded in violence, and there were riots in Cambridge, Maryland, after an incendiary speech there on July 24, 1967, by radical student leader H. Rap Brown. Agnew's principal concern was to maintain law and order, and he denounced Brown as a professional agitator, saying, "I hope they put him away and throw away the key." When the Kerner Commission, appointed by President Johnson to investigate the causes of the unrest, reported that the principal factor was institutional white racism, Agnew dismissed these findings, blaming the "permissive climate and misguided compassion" and adding: "It is not the centuries of racism and deprivation that have built to an explosive crescendo, but ... that lawbreaking has become a socially acceptable and occasionally stylish form of dissent". In March 1968, when faced with a student boycott at Bowie State College, a historically black institution, Agnew again blamed outside agitators and refused to negotiate with the students. When a student committee came to Annapolis and demanded a meeting, Agnew closed the college and ordered more than 200 arrests.

Following the assassination of Martin Luther King Jr. on April 4, 1968, there was widespread rioting and disorder across the US. The trouble reached Baltimore on April 6, and for the next three days and nights the city burned. Agnew declared a state of emergency and called out the National Guard. When order was restored there were six dead, more than 4,000 were under arrest, the fire department had responded to 1,200 fires, and there had been widespread looting. On April 11, Agnew summoned more than 100 moderate black leaders to the state capitol, where instead of the expected constructive dialogue he delivered a speech roundly castigating them for their failure to control more radical elements, and accused them of a cowardly retreat or even complicity. One of the delegates, the Rev. Sidney Daniels, rebuked the governor: "Talk to us like we are ladies and gentlemen", he said, before walking out. Others followed him; the remnant was treated to further accusations as Agnew rejected all socio-economic explanations for the disturbances. Many white suburbanites applauded Agnew's speech: over 90 percent of the 9,000 responses by phone, letter or telegram supported him, and he won tributes from leading Republican conservatives such as Jack Williams, governor of Arizona, and former senator William Knowland of California. To members of the black community the April 11 meeting was a turning point. Having previously welcomed Agnew's stance on civil rights, they now felt betrayed, one state senator observing: "He has sold us out ... he thinks like George Wallace, he talks like George Wallace".

== Vice presidential candidate (1968) ==
=== Background: Rockefeller and Nixon ===
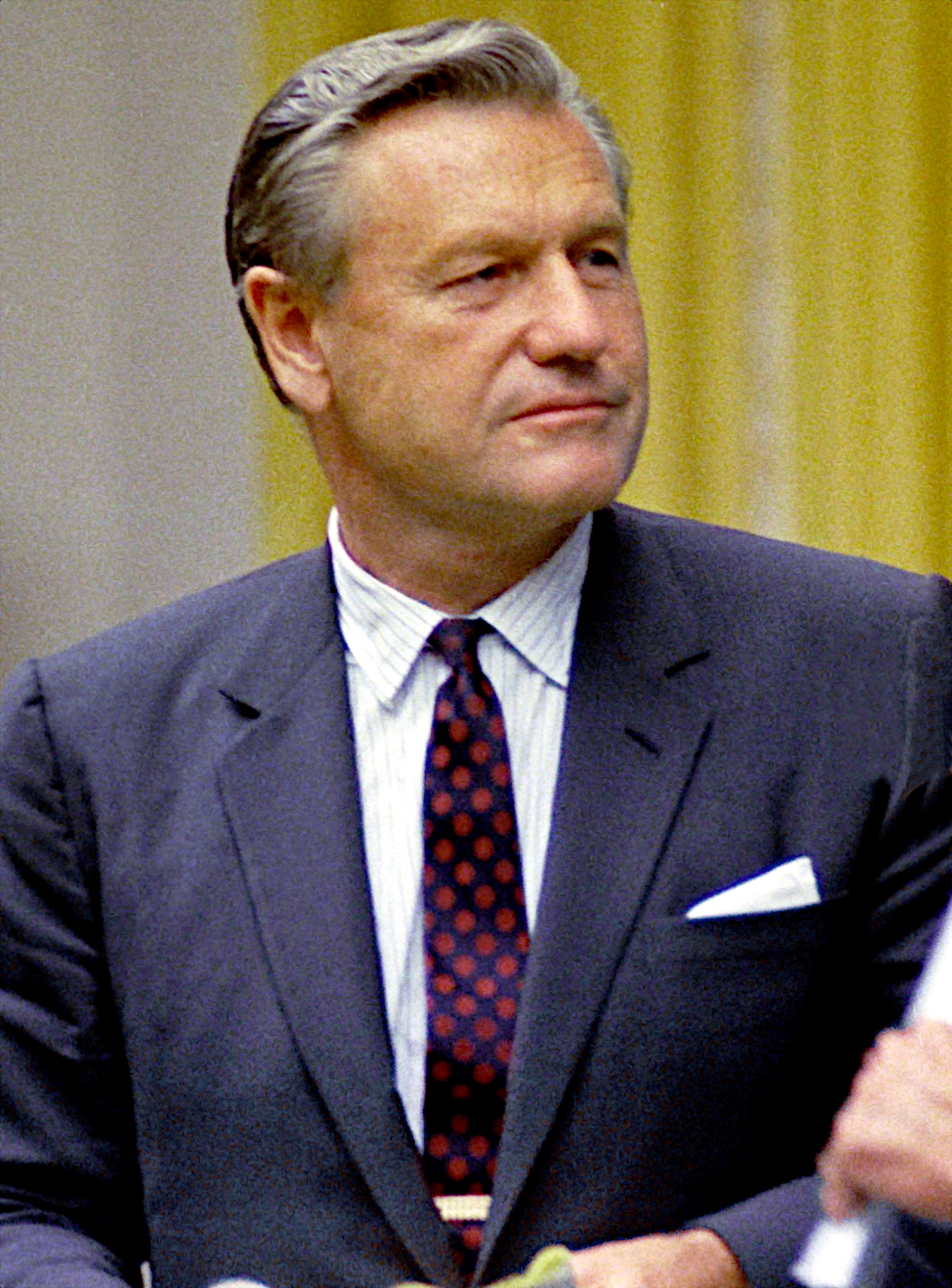
Nelson Rockefeller, Agnew's initial choice for president in 1968

At least until the April 1968 disturbances, Agnew's image was that of a liberal Republican. Since 1964 he had supported the presidential ambitions of Governor Nelson Rockefeller of New York, and early in 1968, with that year's elections looming, he became chairman of the "Rockefeller for President" citizens' committee. When in a televised speech on March 21, 1968, Rockefeller shocked his supporters with an apparently unequivocal withdrawal from the race, Agnew was dismayed and humiliated; despite his very public role in the Rockefeller campaign, he had received no advance warning of the decision. He took this as a personal insult and as a blow to his credibility.

Within days of Rockefeller's announcement, Agnew was being wooed by supporters of the former vice president Richard Nixon, whose campaign for the Republican nomination was well under way. Agnew had no antagonism towards Nixon, and in the wake of Rockefeller's withdrawal had indicated that Nixon might be his "second choice". When the two met in New York on March 29 they found an easy rapport. Agnew's words and actions after the April disturbances in Baltimore delighted conservative members of the Nixon camp such as Pat Buchanan, and also impressed Nixon. When on April 30 Rockefeller re-entered the race, Agnew's reaction was cool. He commended the governor as potentially a "formidable candidate" but did not commit his support: "A lot of things have happened since his withdrawal ... I think I've got to take another look at this situation".

In mid-May, Nixon, interviewed by David Broder of The Washington Post, mentioned the Maryland governor as a possible running mate. As Agnew continued to meet with Nixon and with the candidate's senior aides, there was a growing impression that he was moving into the Nixon camp. At the same time, Agnew denied any political ambitions beyond serving his full four-year term as governor.

=== Republican National Convention ===
As Nixon prepared for the August 1968 Republican National Convention in Miami Beach, he discussed possible running mates with his staff. Among these were Ronald Reagan, the conservative Governor of California; and the more liberal Mayor of New York City, John Lindsay. Nixon felt that these high-profile names could split the party, with Lindsay in particular unacceptable to Southern conservatives, and looked for a less divisive figure. He did not indicate a preferred choice, and Agnew's name was not raised at this stage. Agnew was intending to go to the convention with his Maryland delegation as a favorite son, uncommitted to any of the main candidates.

At the convention, held August 5–8, Agnew abandoned his favorite son status, placing Nixon's name in nomination. Nixon narrowly secured the nomination on the first ballot. In the discussions that followed about a running mate, Nixon kept his counsel while various party factions thought they could influence his choice: Strom Thurmond, the senator from South Carolina, told a party meeting that he held a veto on the vice presidency. It was evident that Nixon wanted a centrist, though there was little enthusiasm when he first proposed Agnew, and other possibilities were discussed. Agnew was seen as a candidate who could appeal to Rockefeller Republicans, was acceptable to Southern Conservatives, and had a solid law-and-order record. Some party insiders thought that Nixon had privately settled on Agnew early on, and that the consideration of other candidates was little more than a charade. On August 8, after a final meeting of advisers and party leaders, Nixon declared that Agnew was his choice, and shortly afterwards announced his decision to the press. Delegates formally nominated Agnew for the vice presidency later that day, before adjourning.

In his acceptance speech, Agnew told the convention he had "a deep sense of the improbability of this moment". Agnew was not yet a national figure, and a widespread reaction to the nomination was "Spiro who?" In Atlanta, three pedestrians gave their reactions to the name when interviewed on television: "It's some kind of disease"; "It's some kind of egg"; "He's a Greek that owns that shipbuilding firm."

=== Campaign ===
In 1968, the Nixon–Agnew ticket faced two principal opponents. The Democrats, at a convention marred by violent demonstrations, had nominated Vice President Hubert Humphrey and Maine Senator Edmund Muskie as their standard-bearers. The segregationist former Governor of Alabama, George Wallace, ran as a third-party candidate and was expected to do well in the Deep South. Nixon, mindful of the restrictions he had labored under as Dwight Eisenhower's running mate in 1952 and 1956, was determined to give Agnew a much freer rein and to make it clear his running mate had his support. Agnew could also usefully play an "attack dog" role, as Nixon had in 1952.

Initially, Agnew played the centrist, pointing to his civil rights record in Maryland. As the campaign developed, he quickly adopted a more belligerent approach, with strong law-and-order rhetoric, a style which alarmed the party's Northern liberals but played well in the South. John Mitchell, Nixon's campaign manager, was impressed, some other party leaders less so; Senator Thruston Morton described Agnew as an "asshole".

Throughout September, Agnew was in the news, generally as a result of what one reporter called his "offensive and sometimes dangerous banality". He used the derogatory term "Polack" to describe Polish-Americans, referred to a Japanese-American reporter as "the fat Jap", and appeared to dismiss poor socio-economic conditions by stating that "if you've seen one slum you've seen them all." He attacked Humphrey as soft on communism, an appeaser like Britain's prewar prime minister Neville Chamberlain. Agnew was mocked by his Democratic opponents; a Humphrey commercial displayed the message "Agnew for Vice President?" against a soundtrack of prolonged hysterical laughter that degenerated into a painful cough, before a final message: "This would be funny if it weren't so serious..." Agnew's comments outraged many, but Nixon did not rein him in; such right-wing populism had a strong appeal in the Southern states and was an effective counter to Wallace. Agnew's rhetoric was also popular in some Northern areas, and helped to galvanize "white backlash" into something less racially defined, more attuned to the suburban ethic defined by historian Peter B. Levy as "orderliness, personal responsibility, the sanctity of hard work, the nuclear family, and law and order".

In late October, Agnew survived an exposé in The New York Times that questioned his financial dealings in Maryland, with Nixon denouncing the paper for "the lowest kind of gutter politics". In the election on November 5, the Republicans were victorious, with a narrow popular vote plurality – 500,000 out of a total of 73 million votes cast. The Electoral College result was more decisive: Nixon 301, Humphrey 191 and Wallace 46. The Republicans narrowly lost Maryland, but Agnew was credited by pollster Louis Harris with helping his party to victory in several border and Upper South states that might easily have fallen to Wallace—South Carolina, North Carolina, Virginia, Tennessee and Kentucky—and with bolstering Nixon's support in suburbs nationally. Had Nixon lost those five states, he would have had only the minimum number of electoral votes needed, 270, and any defection by an elector would have thrown the election to the Democrat-controlled House of Representatives.

== Vice presidency (1969–1973) ==
=== Transition and early days ===
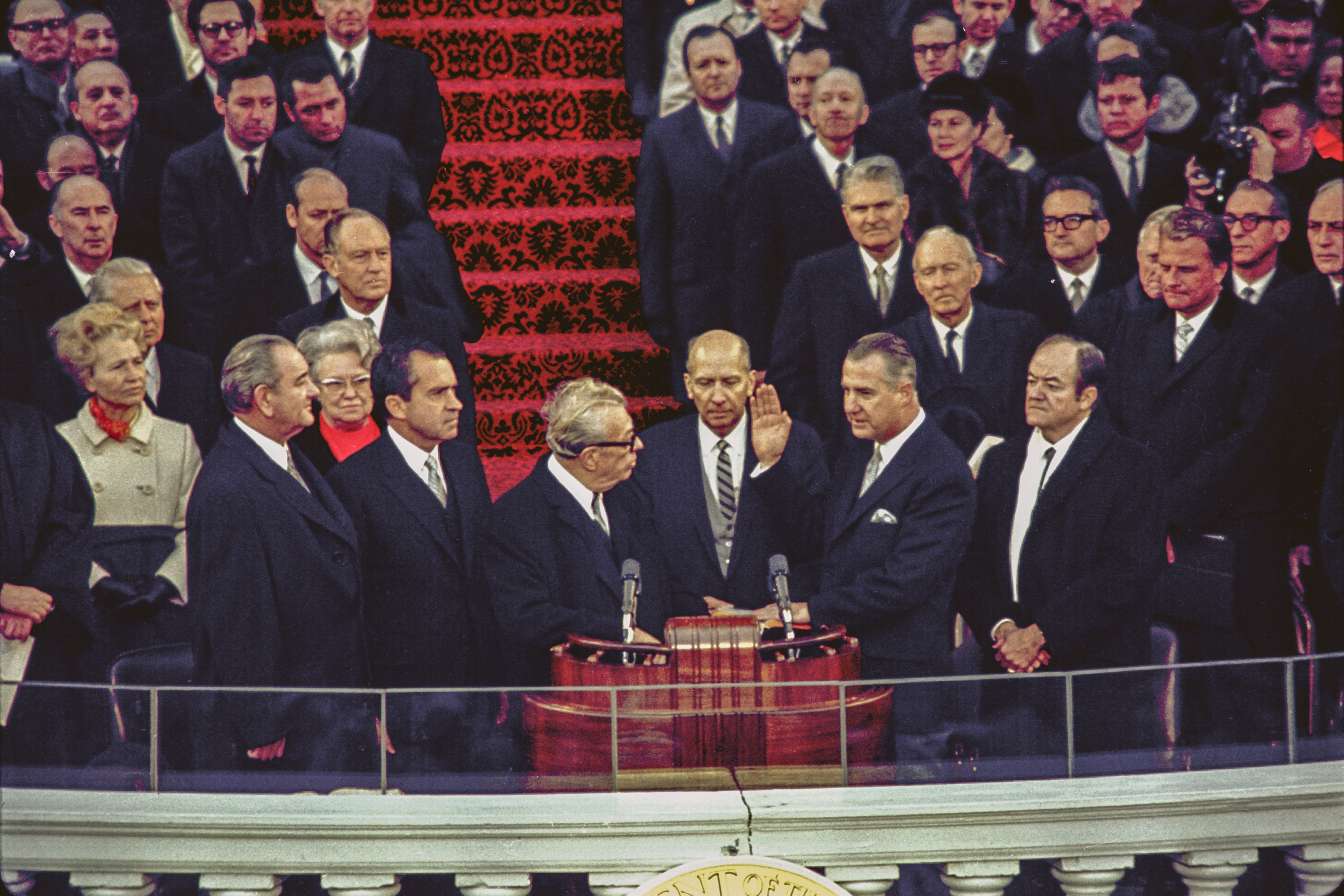
Spiro Agnew is sworn in as vice president in 1969. Front row, from left to right: Lyndon B. Johnson, Richard Nixon, Everett Dirksen, Spiro Agnew (with hand raised), Hubert Humphrey.

Immediately after the 1968 election, Agnew was still uncertain what Nixon would expect of him as vice president. He met with Nixon several days after the election in Key Biscayne, Florida. Nixon, vice president himself for eight years under Eisenhower, wanted to spare Agnew the boredom and lack of a role he had sometimes experienced in that office. When they stood before the press after the meeting, Nixon pledged that Agnew would not have to undertake the ceremonial roles usually undertaken by the holders of the vice presidency, but would have "new duties beyond what any vice president has previously assumed". Nixon told the press that he planned to make full use of Agnew's experience as county executive and as governor in dealing with matters of federal-state relations and in urban affairs.

Nixon established transition headquarters in New York, but Agnew was not invited to meet with him there until November 27, when the two met for an hour. When Agnew spoke to reporters afterwards, he stated that he felt "exhilarated" with his new responsibilities, but did not explain what those were. During the transition period, Agnew traveled extensively, enjoying his new status. He vacationed on St. Croix, where he played a round of golf with Humphrey and Muskie. He went to Memphis for the 1968 Liberty Bowl, and to New York to attend the wedding of Nixon's daughter Julie to David Eisenhower. Agnew was a fan of the Baltimore Colts; in January, he was the guest of team owner Carroll Rosenbloom at Super Bowl III, and watched Joe Namath and the New York Jets upset the Colts, 16–7. There was as yet no official residence for the vice president, and Spiro and Judy Agnew secured a suite at the Sheraton Hotel in Washington formerly occupied by Johnson while vice president. Only one of their children, Kim, the youngest daughter, moved there with them, the others remaining in Maryland.

During the transition, Agnew hired a staff, choosing several aides who had worked with him as county executive and as governor. He hired Charles Stanley Blair as chief of staff; Blair had been a member of the House of Delegates and served as Maryland Secretary of State under Agnew. Arthur Sohmer, Agnew's long-time campaign manager, became his political advisor, and Herb Thompson, a former journalist, became press secretary.

Agnew was sworn in along with Nixon on January 20, 1969; as was customary, he sat down immediately after being sworn in, and did not make a speech. Soon after the inauguration, Nixon appointed Agnew as head of the Office of Intergovernmental Relations, to head government commissions such as the National Space Council and assigned him to work with state governors to bring down crime. It became clear that Agnew would not be in the inner circle of advisors. The new president preferred to deal directly with only a trusted handful, and was annoyed when Agnew tried to call him about matters Nixon deemed trivial. After Agnew shared his opinions on a foreign policy matter in a cabinet meeting, an angry Nixon sent Bob Haldeman to warn Agnew to keep his opinions to himself. Nixon complained that Agnew had no idea how the vice presidency worked, but did not meet with Agnew to share his own experience of the office. Herb Klein, director of communications in the Nixon White House, later wrote that Agnew had allowed himself to be pushed around by senior aides such as Haldeman and John Mitchell, and that Nixon's "inconsistent" treatment of Agnew had left the vice president exposed. Nixon initially gave Agnew an office in the West Wing of the White House, a first for a vice president, although in December 1969 it was given to deputy assistant Alexander Butterfield and Agnew had to move to an office in the Executive Office Building.

Agnew's pride had been stung by the negative news coverage of him during the campaign, and he sought to bolster his reputation by assiduous performance of his duties. It had become usual for the vice president to preside over the Senate only if he might be needed to break a tie, but Agnew opened every session for the first two months of his term, and spent more time presiding, in his first year, than any vice president since Alben Barkley, who held that role under Harry S. Truman. The first postwar vice president not to have previously been a senator, he took lessons in Senate procedures from the Parliamentarian and from a Republican committee staffer. He lunched with small groups of senators, and was initially successful in building good relations. Although silenced on foreign policy matters, he attended White House staff meetings and spoke on urban affairs; when Nixon was present, he often presented the perspective of the governors. Agnew earned praise from the other members when he presided over a meeting of the White House Domestic Council in Nixon's absence but, like Nixon during Eisenhower's illnesses, did not sit in the president's chair. Nevertheless, many of the commission assignments Nixon gave Agnew were sinecures, with the vice president only formally the head.

=== "Nixon's Nixon": attacking the left ===
The public image of Agnew as an uncompromising critic of the violent protests that had marked 1968 persisted into his vice presidency. At first, he tried to take a more conciliatory tone, in line with Nixon's own speeches after taking office. Still, he urged a firm line against violence, stating in a speech in Honolulu on May 2, 1969, that "we have a new breed of self-appointed vigilantes arising—the counterdemonstrators—taking the law into their own hands because officials fail to call law enforcement authorities. We have a vast faceless majority of the American public in quiet fury over the situation—and with good reason."

On October 14, 1969, the day before the anti-war Moratorium, North Vietnamese premier Pham Van Dong released a letter supporting demonstrations in the United States. Nixon resented this, but on the advice of his aides, thought it best to say nothing, and instead had Agnew give a press conference at the White House, calling upon the Moratorium protesters to disavow the support of the North Vietnamese. Agnew handled the task well, and Nixon tasked Agnew with attacking the Democrats generally, while remaining above the fray himself. This was analogous to the role Nixon had performed as vice president in the Eisenhower White House; thus Agnew was dubbed "Nixon's Nixon". Agnew had finally found a role in the Nixon administration, one he enjoyed.

Nixon had Agnew deliver a series of speeches attacking their political opponents. In New Orleans on October 19, Agnew blamed liberal elites for condoning violence by demonstrators: "a spirit of national masochism prevails, encouraged by an effete corps of impudent snobs who characterize themselves as intellectuals". The following day, in Jackson, Mississippi, Agnew told a Republican dinner, "for too long the South has been the punching bag for those who characterize themselves as liberal intellectuals ... their course is a course that will ultimately weaken and erode the very fiber of America." Denying Republicans had a Southern Strategy, Agnew stressed that the administration and Southern whites had much in common, including the disapproval of the elites. Levy argued that such remarks were designed to attract Southern whites to the Republican Party to help secure the re-election of Nixon and Agnew in 1972, and that Agnew's rhetoric "could have served as the blueprint for the culture wars of the next twenty-to-thirty years, including the claim that Democrats were soft on crime, unpatriotic, and favored flag burning rather than flag waving". The attendees at the speeches were enthusiastic, but other Republicans, especially from the cities, complained to the Republican National Committee that Agnew's attacks were overbroad.

In the wake of these remarks, Nixon delivered his Silent Majority speech on November 3, 1969, calling on "the great silent majority of my fellow Americans" to support the administration's policy in Vietnam. The speech was well received by the public, but less so by the press, who strongly attacked Nixon's allegations that only a minority of Americans opposed the war. Nixon speechwriter Pat Buchanan penned a speech in response, to be delivered by Agnew on November 13 in Des Moines, Iowa. The White House worked to assure the maximum exposure for Agnew's speech, and the networks covered it live, making it a nationwide address, a rarity for vice presidents. According to Witcover, "Agnew made the most of it".

Historically, the press had enjoyed considerable prestige and respect to that point, though some Republicans complained of bias. But in his Des Moines speech, Agnew attacked the media, complaining that immediately after Nixon's speech, "his words and policies were subjected to instant analysis and querulous criticism ... by a small band of network commentators and self-appointed analysts, the majority of whom expressed in one way or another their hostility to what he had to say ... It was obvious that their minds were made up in advance." Agnew continued, "I am asking whether a form of censorship already exists when the news that forty million Americans receive each night is determined by a handful of men ... and filtered through a handful of commentators who admit their own set of biases".

Agnew thus put into words feelings that many Republicans and conservatives had long felt about the news media. Television network executives and commentators responded with outrage. Julian Goodman, president of NBC, stated that Agnew had made an "appeal to prejudice ... it is regrettable that the Vice President of the United States should deny to TV freedom of the press". Frank Stanton, head of CBS, accused Agnew of trying to intimidate the news media, and his news anchor, Walter Cronkite, agreed. The speech was praised by conservatives from both parties, and gave Agnew a following among the right. Agnew deemed the Des Moines speech one of his finest moments.

On November 20 in Montgomery, Alabama, Agnew reinforced his earlier speech with an attack on The New York Times and The Washington Post, again originated by Buchanan. Both papers had enthusiastically endorsed Agnew's candidacy for governor in 1966 but had castigated him as unfit for the vice presidency two years later. The Post in particular had been hostile to Nixon since the Hiss case in the 1940s. Agnew accused the papers of sharing a narrow viewpoint alien to most Americans. Agnew alleged that the newspapers were trying to circumscribe his First Amendment right to speak of what he believed, while demanding unfettered freedom for themselves, and warned, "the day when the network commentators and even the gentlemen of The New York Times enjoyed a form of diplomatic immunity from comment and criticism of what they said is over."

After Montgomery, Nixon sought a détente with the media, and Agnew's attacks ended. Agnew's approval rating soared to 64 percent in late November, and the Times called him "a formidable political asset" to the administration. The speeches gave Agnew a power base among conservatives, and boosted his presidential chances for the 1976 election.

=== 1970: Protesters and midterm elections ===
Agnew's attacks on the administration's opponents, and the flair with which he made his addresses, made him popular as a speaker at Republican fundraising events. He traveled over 25,000 miles (40,000 km) on behalf of the Republican National Committee in early 1970, speaking at a number of Lincoln Day events, and supplanted Reagan as the party's leading fundraiser. Agnew's involvement had Nixon's strong support. In his Chicago speech, the vice president attacked "supercilious sophisticates", while in Atlanta, he promised to continue speaking out lest he break faith with "the Silent Majority, the everyday law-abiding American who believes his country needs a strong voice to articulate his dissatisfaction with those who seek to destroy our heritage of liberty and our system of justice".

Agnew continued to try to increase his influence with Nixon, against the opposition of Haldeman, who was consolidating his power as the second most powerful person in the administration. Agnew was successful in being heard at an April 22, 1970, meeting of the National Security Council. An impediment to Nixon's plan for Vietnamization of the war in Southeast Asia was increasing Viet Cong control of parts of Cambodia, beyond the reach of South Vietnamese troops and used as sanctuaries. Feeling that Nixon was getting overly dovish advice from Secretary of State William P. Rogers and Secretary of Defense Melvin Laird, Agnew stated that if the sanctuaries were a threat, they should be attacked and neutralized. Nixon chose to attack the Viet Cong positions in Cambodia, a decision that had Agnew's support, and that he remained convinced was correct after his resignation.

The continuing student protests against the war brought Agnew's scorn. In a speech on April 28 in Hollywood, Florida, Agnew stated that responsibility of the unrest lay with those who failed to guide them, and suggested that the alumni of Yale University fire its president, Kingman Brewster. The Cambodia incursion brought more demonstrations on campus, and on May 3, Agnew went on Face the Nation to defend the policy. Reminded that Nixon, in his inaugural address, had called for the lowering of voices in political discourse, Agnew commented, "When a fire takes place, a man doesn't run into the room and whisper ... he yells, 'Fire!' and I am yelling 'Fire!' because I think 'Fire!' needs to be called here". The Kent State shootings took place the following day, but Agnew did not tone down his attacks on demonstrators, alleging that he was responding to "a general malaise that argues for violent confrontation instead of debate". Nixon had Haldeman tell Agnew to avoid remarks about students; Agnew strongly disagreed and stated that he would only refrain if Nixon directly ordered it.

Nixon's agenda had been impeded by the fact that Congress was controlled by Democrats and he hoped to take control of the Senate in the 1970 midterm elections. Worried that Agnew was too divisive a figure, Nixon and his aides initially planned to restrict Agnew's role to fundraising and the giving of a standard stump speech that would avoid personal attacks. The president believed that appealing to white, middle- and lower-class voters on social issues would lead to Republican victories in November. He planned not to do any active campaigning, but to remain above the fray and let Agnew campaign as spokesman for the Silent Majority.

On September 10 in Springfield, Illinois, speaking on behalf of Republican Senator Ralph Smith, Agnew began his campaign, which would be noted for harsh rhetoric and memorable phrases. Agnew attacked the "pusillanimous pussyfooting" of the liberals, including those in Congress, who Agnew said cared nothing for the blue- and white-collar workers, the "Forgotten Man of American politics". Addressing the California Republican Convention in San Diego, Agnew targeted "the nattering nabobs of negativism. They who have formed their own 4-H Club—the 'Hopeless, Hysterical, Hypochondriacs of History'." He warned that candidates of any party that espoused radical views should be voted out, a reference to New York Senator Charles Goodell, who was on the ballot that November, and who opposed the Vietnam War. Believing that the strategy was working, Nixon met with Agnew at the White House on September 24, and urged him to continue.

Nixon wanted to get rid of Goodell, a Republican who had been appointed by Governor Rockefeller after the assassination of Robert F. Kennedy, and who had shifted considerably to the left while in office. Goodell could be sacrificed as there was a Conservative Party candidate, James Buckley, who might win the seat. Nixon did not want to be seen as engineering the defeat of a fellow Republican, and did not have Agnew go to New York until after Nixon left on a European trip, hoping Agnew would be perceived as acting on his own. After dueling long-distance with Goodell over the report of the Scranton Commission on campus violence (Agnew considered it too permissive), Agnew gave a speech in New York in which, without naming names, he made it clear he supported Buckley. That Nixon was behind the machinations did not remain secret long, as both Agnew and Nixon adviser Murray Chotiner disclosed it; Goodell stated he still believed he had Nixon's support. Although it was by then deemed unlikely the Republicans could gain control of the Senate, both Nixon and Agnew went on the campaign trail for the final days before the election. The outcome was disappointing: Republicans gained only two seats in the Senate, and lost eleven governorships. For Agnew, one bright spot was Goodell's defeat by Buckley in New York, but he was disappointed when his former chief of staff, Charles Blair, failed to unseat Governor Marvin Mandel, Agnew's successor and a Democrat, in Maryland.

=== Re-election in 1972 ===
Through 1971, it was uncertain if Agnew would be retained on the ticket as Nixon sought a second term in 1972. Neither Nixon nor his aides were enamored of Agnew's independence and outspokenness, and were less than happy at Agnew's popularity among conservatives suspicious of Nixon. The President considered replacing him with Treasury Secretary John Connally, a Democrat and former Governor of Texas. For his part, Agnew was unhappy with many of Nixon's stances, especially in foreign policy, disliking Nixon's rapprochement with China (on which Agnew was not consulted) and believing that the Vietnam War could be won with sufficient force. Even after Nixon announced his re-election bid at the start of 1972, it was unclear if Agnew would be his running mate, and it was not until July 21 that Nixon asked Agnew and the vice president accepted. A public announcement was made the following day.

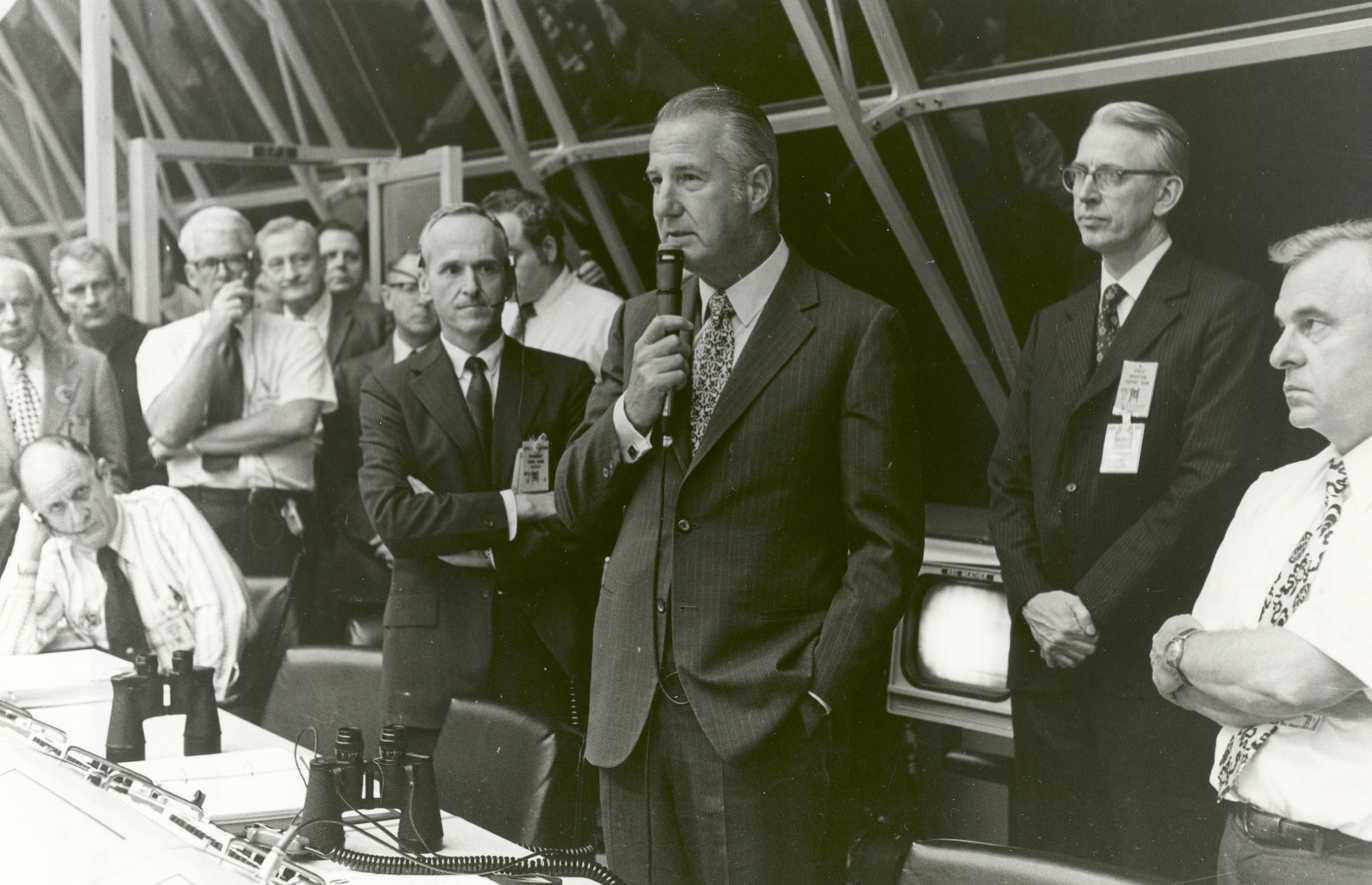
Spiro Agnew congratulates launch control after the launch of Apollo 17 in 1972.

Nixon instructed Agnew to avoid personal attacks on the press and the Democratic presidential nominee, South Dakota Senator George McGovern, to stress the positives of the Nixon administration, and not to comment on what might happen in 1976. At the 1972 Republican National Convention in Miami Beach, Agnew was greeted as a hero by delegates who saw him as the party's future. After being nominated for a second term, Agnew delivered an acceptance speech focused on the administration's accomplishments, and avoided his usual slashing invective, but he condemned McGovern for supporting busing, and alleged that McGovern, if elected, would beg the North Vietnamese for the return of American prisoners of war. The Watergate break-in was a minor issue in the campaign; for once, Agnew's exclusion from Nixon's inner circle worked in his favor, as he knew nothing of the matter until reading of it in the press, and upon learning from Jeb Magruder that administration officials were responsible for the break-in, cut off discussion of the matter. He viewed the break-in as foolish, and felt that both major parties routinely spied on each other. Nixon had instructed Agnew not to attack McGovern's initial running mate, Missouri Senator Thomas Eagleton, and after Eagleton withdrew amid revelations concerning past mental health treatment, Nixon renewed those instructions for former ambassador Sargent Shriver, who had become the new candidate for vice president.

Nixon took the high road in the campaign, but still wanted McGovern attacked for his positions, and the task fell in part to Agnew. The vice president told the press he was anxious to discard the image he had earned as a partisan campaigner in 1968 and 1970, and wanted to be perceived as conciliatory. He defended Nixon on Watergate, and when McGovern alleged that the Nixon administration was the most corrupt in history, made a speech in South Dakota, describing McGovern as a "desperate candidate who can't seem to understand that the American people don't want a philosophy of defeat and self-hate put upon them".

The race was never close, as the McGovern/Shriver ticket's campaign was effectively over before it even began. The Nixon/Agnew ticket easily won reelection, winning 49 states (losing only Massachusetts and the District of Columbia) and over 60 percent of the vote. Trying to position himself as the front-runner for 1976, Agnew campaigned widely for Republican candidates, something Nixon would not do. Despite Agnew's efforts, Democrats easily held both houses of Congress, gaining two seats in the Senate, though the Republicans gained twelve in the House.

=== Criminal investigation and resignation ===
External videos
- Presentation by George Beall on the 30th anniversary of the Agnew resignation, September 30, 2003, C-SPAN
- Q&A interview with then-Assistant U.S. Attorneys Ron Liebman and Tim Baker on their experiences prosecuting Agnew, February 3, 2019, C-SPAN

In early 1972, George Beall, the United States Attorney for the District of Maryland, opened an investigation of corruption in Baltimore County, involving public officials, architects, engineering firms, and paving contractors. Beall's target was the then-current political leadership in Baltimore County. There were rumors that Agnew might be involved, which Beall initially discounted; Agnew had not been county executive since December 1966, so any wrongdoing potentially committed while he held that office could not be prosecuted because the statute of limitations had expired. As part of the investigation, Lester Matz's engineering firm was served with a subpoena for documents, and through his counsel he sought immunity in exchange for cooperation in the investigation. Matz had been kicking back to Agnew five percent of the value of contracts received through his influence, first county contracts during his term in Towson, and subsequently state contracts while Agnew was governor.

Investigative reporters and Democratic operatives had pursued rumors that Agnew had been corrupt during his years as a Maryland official, but had been unable to substantiate them. In February 1973, Agnew heard of the investigation and had Attorney General Richard Kleindienst contact Beall. The vice president's personal attorney, George White, visited Beall, who stated that Agnew was not under investigation, and that prosecutors would do their best to protect Agnew's name. In June, Matz's attorney disclosed to Beall that his client could show that Agnew not only had been corrupt, but that payments to him had continued into his vice presidency. The statute of limitations would not prevent Agnew from being prosecuted for these later payments. On July 3, Beall informed the new Attorney General, Elliot Richardson. At the end of the month Nixon, through his chief of staff, Alexander Haig, was informed. Agnew had already met with both Nixon and Haig to assert his innocence. On August 1, Beall sent a letter to Agnew's attorney, formally advising that the vice president was under investigation for tax fraud and corruption. Matz was prepared to testify that he had met with Agnew at the White House and given him $10,000 in cash Another witness, Jerome B. Wolff, head of Maryland's road commission, had extensive documentation that detailed, as Beall put it, "every corrupt payment he participated in with then-Governor Agnew".

Richardson, whom Nixon had ordered to take personal responsibility for the investigation, met with Agnew and his attorneys on August 6 to outline the case, but Agnew denied culpability, saying the selection of Matz's firm had been routine, and the money was a campaign contribution. The story broke in The Wall Street Journal later that day. Agnew publicly proclaimed his innocence and on August 8 held a press conference at which he called the stories "damned lies". Nixon, at a meeting on August 7, assured Agnew of his complete confidence, but Haig visited Agnew at his office and suggested that if the charges could be sustained, Agnew might want to take action before being indicted. By this time, the Watergate investigation that would lead to Nixon's resignation was well advanced. For the next two months, fresh revelations in each scandal were almost daily fare in the newspapers.

Under increasing pressure to resign, Agnew took the position that a sitting vice president could not be indicted and met with Speaker of the House Carl Albert on September 25, asking for an investigation. He cited as precedent an 1826 House investigation of Vice President John C. Calhoun, who was alleged to have taken improper payments while a cabinet member. Albert, second in line to the presidency under Agnew, responded that it would be improper for the House to act in a matter before the courts. Agnew also filed a motion to block any indictment on the grounds that he had been prejudiced by improper leaks from the Justice Department, and tried to rally public opinion, giving a speech before a friendly audience in Los Angeles asserting his innocence and attacking the prosecution. Nevertheless, Agnew entered into negotiations for a plea bargain on the condition that he would not serve jail time. He wrote in his memoirs that he entered the plea bargain because he was worn out from the extended crisis, to protect his family, and because he feared he could not get a fair trial. He made his decision on October 5, and plea negotiations took place over the following days. On October 9, Agnew visited Nixon at the White House and informed the President of his impending resignation.

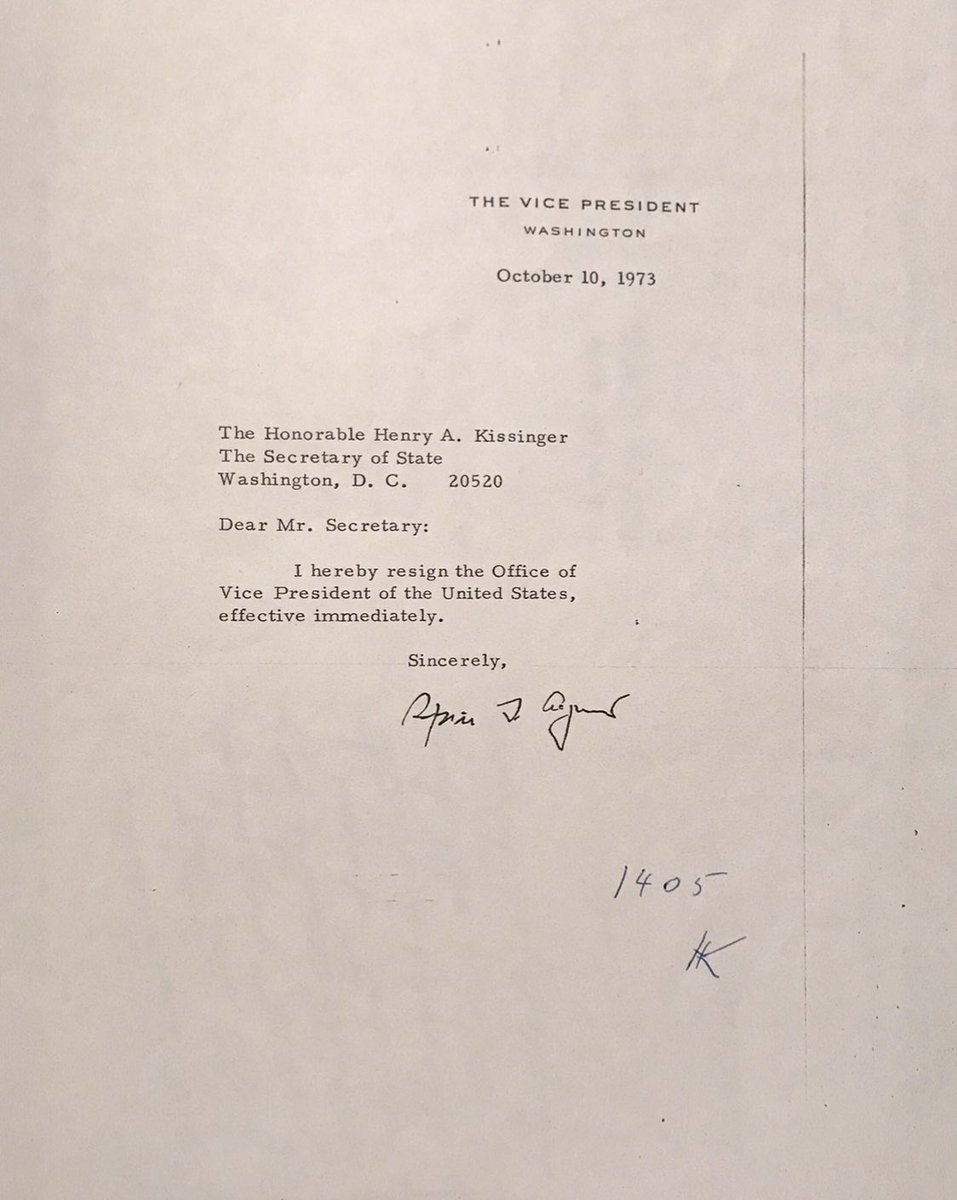
Photocopy of Agnew's letter of resignation, initialled and timed "1405" by Henry Kissinger. The initialled photocopy was returned to Agnew; the original is lost.

On October 10, 1973, Agnew appeared before the federal court in Baltimore, and pleaded nolo contendere (no contest) to one felony charge, tax evasion, for the year 1967. Richardson agreed that there would be no further prosecution of Agnew, and released a 40-page summary of the evidence. Agnew was fined $10,000 and placed on three years' unsupervised probation. Immediately prior to entering court, Agnew had an aide submit his formal letter of resignation to the Secretary of State, Henry Kissinger, and sent a letter to Nixon stating he was resigning in the best interest of the nation. Nixon responded with a letter concurring that the resignation was necessary to avoid a lengthy period of division and uncertainty, and applauding Agnew for his patriotism and dedication to the welfare of the United States.

== Post-vice presidency (1973–1996) ==
=== Subsequent career: 1973–1990 ===
Soon after his resignation, Agnew moved to his summer home at Ocean City. To cover urgent tax and legal bills, and living expenses, he borrowed $200,000 (equivalent to $1.45 million in 2025) from his friend Frank Sinatra. He had hoped he could resume a career as a lawyer, but in 1974, the Maryland Court of Appeals disbarred him, calling him "morally obtuse". To earn his living, he founded a business consultancy, Pathlite Inc., which in the following years attracted a widespread international clientele. One deal concerned a contract for the supply of uniforms to the Iraqi Army, involving negotiations with Saddam Hussein and Nicolae Ceauşescu of Romania.

Agnew pursued other business interests: an unsuccessful land deal in Kentucky, and an equally fruitless partnership with golfer Doug Sanders over a beer distributionship in Texas. In 1976 he published a novel, The Canfield Decision, about an American vice president's troubled relationship with his president. The book received mixed reviews, but was commercially successful, with Agnew receiving $100,000 for serialization rights alone. The book landed Agnew in controversy; his fictional counterpart, George Canfield, refers to "Jewish cabals and Zionist lobbies" and their hold over the American media, a charge which Agnew, while on a book tour, asserted was true in real life. This brought complaints from Seymour Graubard, of the Anti-Defamation League of B'nai B'rith, and a rebuke from President Ford, then campaigning for re-election. Agnew denied any antisemitism or bigotry: "My contention is that routinely the American news media ... favors the Israeli position and does not in a balanced way present the other equities". Also in 1976, Agnew announced that he was establishing a charitable foundation "Education for Democracy", but nothing more was heard of this after B'nai B'rith accused it of being a front for Agnew's anti-Israeli views. Agnew's anti-Zionist views seemed to have developed after leaving office—as vice president, he expressed admiration for Israel and was friendly with his Jewish staff members.

In 1977, Agnew was wealthy enough to move to a new home at The Springs Country Club in Rancho Mirage, California, and shortly afterwards to repay the Sinatra loan. That year, in a series of televised interviews with British TV host David Frost, Nixon claimed that he had had no direct role in the processes that had led to Agnew's resignation and implied that his vice president had been hounded by the liberal media: "He made mistakes ... but I do not think for one minute that Spiro Agnew consciously felt that he was violating the law".

In 1980, Agnew wrote to Fahd bin Abdulaziz, at the time Crown Prince and de facto Prime Minister of Saudi Arabia, claiming that he had been bled dry by attacks on him by Zionists, whom he blamed for forcing him out of office. He requested an interest-free three-year loan of $2 million, to be deposited in a Swiss bank account, on which the interest would be available to Agnew. He stated that he would use the funds to "continue my effort to inform the American people of their (i.e., Zionists') control of the media and other influential sectors of American society." He also congratulated the crown prince on his call for jihad against Israel, whose declaration of Jerusalem as its capital he characterized as "the final provocation". A month later he thanked the crown prince for giving him "the resources to continue the battle against the Zionist community here in the U.S."

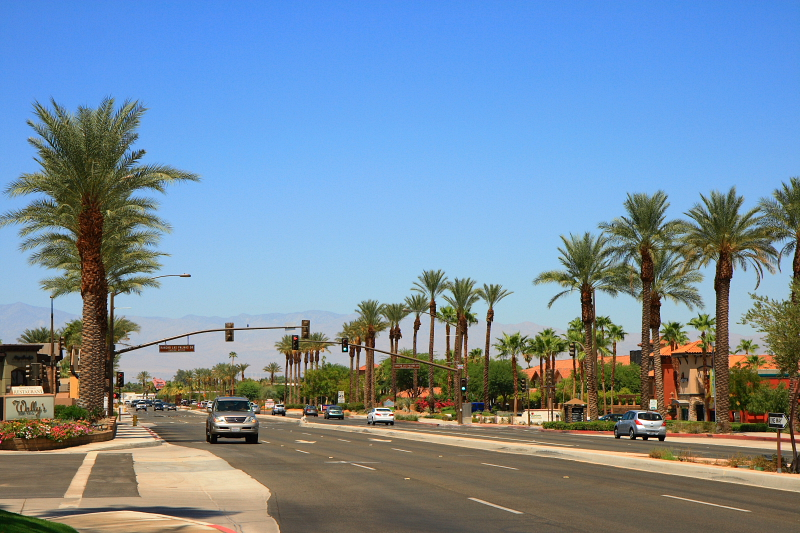
Rancho Mirage, California, Agnew's home from 1977

In 1980, Agnew published a memoir, Go Quietly ... or Else. In it, he protested his total innocence of the charges that had brought his resignation. His assertions of innocence were undermined when his former lawyer George White testified that his client had admitted statehouse bribery to him, saying it had been going on "for a thousand years". Agnew also made a new claim: that he resigned because he had been warned by White House Chief of Staff Alexander Haig to "go quietly" or face an unspoken threat of possible assassination. Haig denied the story, saying that it was "preposterous", and the Agnew aide who supposedly reported this warning to Agnew also denied it, saying there was "never any threat of bodily harm". Agnew biographer Joseph P. Coffey describes the claim as "absurd".

After the publication of Go Quietly, Agnew largely disappeared from public view. In a rare TV interview in 1980, he advised young people not to go into politics because too much was expected of those in high public office. Students of Professor John F. Banzhaf III from the George Washington University Law School found three residents of the state of Maryland willing to put their names on a case that sought to have Agnew repay the state $268,482, the amount it was said he had taken in bribes, including interest and penalties, as a public employee. In 1981, a judge ruled that "Mr. Agnew had no lawful right to this money under any theory," and ordered him to pay the state $147,500 for the kickbacks and $101,235 in interest. After two unsuccessful appeals by Agnew, he finally paid the sum in 1983. In 1989, Agnew applied unsuccessfully for this sum to be treated as tax-deductible.

Agnew also was briefly in the news in 1987, when as the plaintiff in Federal District Court in Brooklyn, he revealed information about his then-recent business activities through his company, Pathlite, Inc. Among other activities, Agnew arranged contracts in Taiwan and Saudi Arabia, and represented a conglomerate based in South Korea, a German aircraft manufacturer, a French company that made uniforms, and a dredging company from Greece. He also represented the Hoppmann Corporation, an American company attempting to arrange for communications work in Argentina. He also discussed with local businessmen a potential concert by Frank Sinatra in Argentina. Agnew wrote in court papers "I have one utility, and that's the ability to penetrate to the top people."

=== Final years and death ===
External videos
- Spiro Agnew bust unveiling, U.S. Capitol building, May 24, 1995, C-SPAN

For the remainder of his life, Agnew kept distant from news media and Washington politics. Stating he felt "totally abandoned", Agnew declined to take any and all phone calls from President Nixon. When Nixon died in 1994, his daughters invited Agnew to attend the funeral at Yorba Linda, California. At first he refused, still bitter over how he had been treated by the White House in his final days as vice president; over the years he had rejected various overtures from the Nixon camp to mend fences. He was persuaded to accept the invitation, and received a warm welcome there from his former colleagues. "I decided after twenty years of resentment to put it aside", he said. A year later, Agnew appeared at the Capitol in Washington for the dedication of a bust of him, to be placed with those of other vice presidents. Agnew commented: "I am not blind or deaf to the fact that some people feel that ... the Senate by commissioning this bust is giving me an honor I don't deserve. I would remind these people that ... this ceremony has less to do with Spiro Agnew than with the office I held".

On September 16, 1996, Agnew collapsed at his summer home in Ocean City, Maryland. He was taken to Atlantic General Hospital in Berlin, Maryland, where he died the following evening. The cause of death was undiagnosed acute leukemia. Agnew remained fit and active into his seventies, playing golf and tennis regularly, and was scheduled to play tennis with a friend on the day of his death. The funeral, at Timonium, Maryland, was mainly confined to family; Buchanan and some of Agnew's former Secret Service detail also attended to pay their final respects. In recognition of his service as vice president and combat veteran, an honor guard of the combined military services fired a rifle volley at the graveside. Agnew's wife Judith survived him by 16 years, dying at Rancho Mirage on June 20, 2012.

== Legacy ==
At the time of his death, Agnew's legacy was perceived largely in negative terms. The circumstances of his fall from public life, particularly in the light of his declared dedication to law and order, did much to engender cynicism and distrust towards politicians of every stripe. His disgrace led to a greater degree of care in the selection of potential vice presidents. Most of the running mates selected by the major parties after 1972 were seasoned politicians—Walter Mondale, George H. W. Bush, Lloyd Bentsen, Dan Quayle, Al Gore, Jack Kemp, Joe Lieberman, Dick Cheney, and Joe Biden—some of whom themselves became their party's nominee for president.

Some recent historians have seen Agnew as important in the development of the New Right, arguing that he should be honored alongside the acknowledged founding fathers of the movement such as Goldwater and Reagan; Victor Gold, Agnew's former press secretary, considered him the movement's "John the Baptist". Goldwater's crusade in 1964, at the height of Johnsonian liberalism, came too early, but by the time of Agnew's election, liberalism was on the wane, and as Agnew moved to the right after 1968, the country moved with him. Agnew's fall shocked and saddened conservatives, but it did not inhibit the growth of the New Right. Agnew, the first suburban politician to achieve high office, helped to popularize the view that much of the national media was controlled by elitist and effete liberals. Levy noted that Agnew "helped recast the Republicans as a Party of 'Middle Americans' and, even in disgrace, reinforced the public's distrust of government."

For Agnew himself, despite his rise from his origins in Baltimore to next in line to the presidency, "there could be little doubt that history's judgment was already upon him, the first Vice President of the United States to have resigned in disgrace. All that he achieved or sought to achieve in his public life ... had been buried in that tragic and irrefutable act".

Levy sums up the "might-have-been" of Agnew's career thus:

It is not a far stretch to imagine that if Agnew had contested corruption charges half as hard as Nixon denied culpability for Watergate—as Goldwater and several other stalwart conservatives wanted him to—today we might be speaking of Agnew-Democrats and Agnewnomics, and deem Agnew the father of modern conservatism.

== See also ==
- List of members of the American Legion

Political offices
Preceded by Christian H. Kahl	Executive of Baltimore County; 1962–1966	Succeeded by Dale Anderson
Preceded by J. Millard Tawes	Governor of Maryland; 1967–1969	Succeeded by Marvin Mandel
Preceded by Hubert Humphrey	Vice President of the United States; 1969–1973	Succeeded by Gerald Ford
Party political offices
Preceded by Frank Small Jr.	Republican nominee for Governor of Maryland; 1966	Succeeded by Rogers Morton
Preceded by William E. Miller	Republican nominee for Vice President of the United States; 1968, 1972	Succeeded by Bob Dole
