= Dennis F. Rasmussen =

American politician (born 1947)

8th Baltimore County Executive
- In office 1986–1990
- Preceded by: Donald P. Hutchinson
- Succeeded by: Roger B. Hayden

Member of the Maryland Senate from the 6th district
- In office 1982–1986

Member of the Maryland Senate from the 7th district
- In office 1978–1982

Member of the Maryland House of Delegates from the 7th district
- In office 1975–1978

Personal details
- Born: June 14, 1947 (age 79) Essex, Maryland
- Party: Democratic

Dennis F. Rasmussen (born June 14, 1947) is an American politician from the state of Maryland. A member of the Democratic Party, he has served as Baltimore County Executive, a Delegate within the Maryland House of Delegates and a Senator within the Maryland Senate. He ran unsuccessfully in the 2006 Maryland U.S. Senate election.

== Education ==
Rasmussen graduated from Kenwood High School in Essex, Maryland. He attended Essex Community College but obtained a bachelor's degree in economics from Loyola College in Baltimore, Maryland, in 1970.

== Career ==
Rasmussen was established and later served as President of The Rasmussen Group, a political lobbying group.

His career includes political office experience, entrepreneurial experience in lobbying, association management, banking, and marketing services, and directorships on various boards of major corporate entities and community nonprofits. He developed and operated several businesses in the fields of information development, alternative energy and real estate. As a lobbyist, Rasmussen has worked at local, state and federal government levels.

Additionally, Rasmussen is a Principal in consulting firms such as Chesapeake Renewable Energy, LLC, Chesapeake Ventures, LLC, and Rasmussen/Swanzey Strategic Partners, LLC.

== Politics ==
Before his advocacy career, Rasmussen was chairman of the Maryland Senate Finance Committee and a state senator from 1978 to 1986. Rasmussen held various key positions, ranging from Majority Whip, Chairman of the Joint Budget and Audit Committee to Chairman of the Finance Committee.

Rasmussen served a single term as Baltimore County Executive between 1986 and 1990. Two decades later, he ran unsuccessfully for the junior Maryland seat in the 2006 U.S. Senate election.

== Charity ==
Rasmussen serves on numerous boards, including the Chairman of the Board of Visitors at Towson University, where he is also an adjunct professor teaching public policy courses. Rasmussen also serves as a current member of: Board of Trustees at the Franklin Square Hospital Center; Board of Trustees for the Franklin Square Hospital Center Foundation; Chairman of the Board of Directors for the Port Discovery Children's Museum, and Current Board Member of the Arc of Baltimore.

Political offices
Preceded by Donald P. Hutchinson	Baltimore County Executive; 1986–1990	Succeeded by Roger B. Hayden
