= Baltimore County Executive =

Elected official

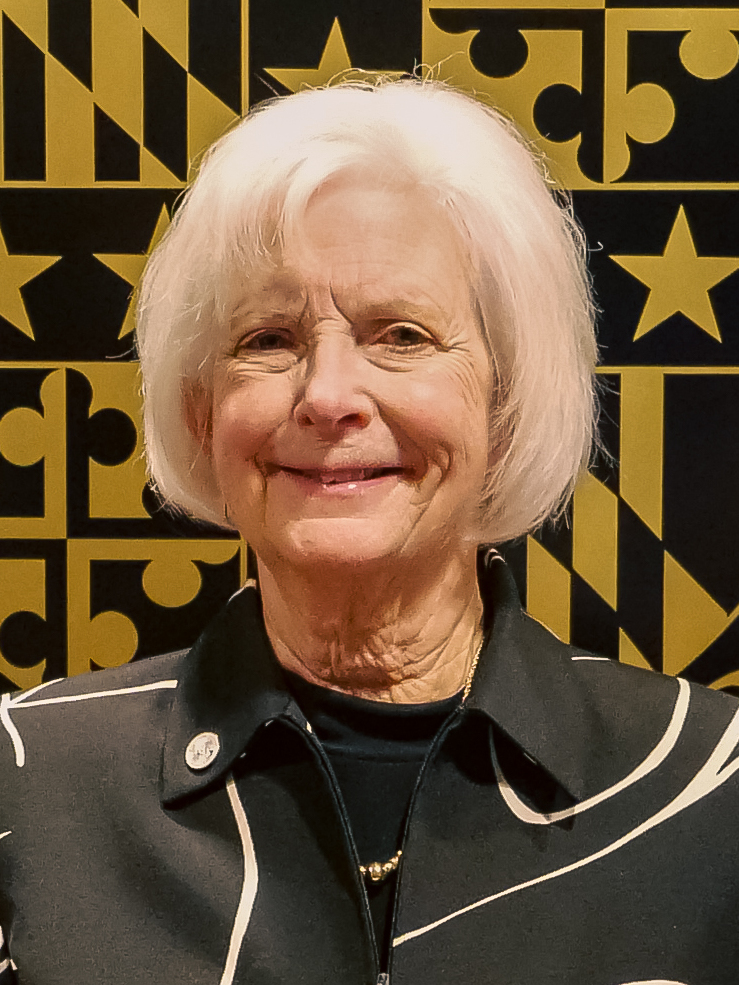
- Incumbent; Katherine A. Klausmeier; Acting since 2025
- Term length: 4 years
- Inaugural holder: Michael J. Birmingham
- Formation: December 6, 1956
- Website: Official website

The Baltimore County executive is the highest elected official representing the government of Baltimore County, Maryland, United States. The office was established with the implementation of the county charter for Baltimore County on November 6, 1956. The county executive is elected to post every four years, coinciding with the elections for the county council and governor of Maryland.

Two Baltimore county executives have later achieved prominence after leaving office: Spiro T. Agnew, who went on to become governor of Maryland and Vice President of the United States under Richard Nixon, resigned in 1973 due to scandal while serving in that office; and Dutch Ruppersberger, who went on to represent Maryland's 2nd congressional district in the United States House of Representatives.

The incumbent Baltimore County executive is Katherine A. Klausmeier.

== List of Baltimore County executives ==
#	Portrait	Executive	Term start	Term end	Terms	Party	Notes
1		Michael J. Birmingham	1956	December 1958	1	Democratic	Did not seek reelection
2		Christian H. Kahl	December 1958	December 1962	1	Democratic	Lost Reelection
3		Spiro T. Agnew	December 1962	December 1966	1	Republican	Did not seek reelection. Ran successfully for Governor of Maryland
4		N. Dale Anderson	December 1966	March 1974	1 1/2	Democratic	Convicted on federal charges and resigned from office
5		Frederick L. Dewberry (Acting)^{1}	March 1974	December 1974	Partial	Democratic	Succeeded the County Executive seat as County Administrative Officer following Anderson's resignation
6		Theodore G. "Ted" Venetoulis	December 1974	December 1978	1	Democratic	Did not seek reelection. Ran unsuccessfully for Governor of Maryland
7		Donald P. Hutchinson	December 1978	December 4, 1986	2	Democratic	Term limited
8		Dennis F. Rasmussen	December 4, 1986	December 3, 1990	1	Democratic	Lost reelection
9		Roger B. Hayden	December 3, 1990	December 2, 1994	1	Republican	Lost reelection
10		C.A. Dutch Ruppersberger, III	December 2, 1994	December 2, 2002	2	Democratic	Term limited. Ran successfully for a seat in the US House of Representatives
11		James T. Smith, Jr.	December 2, 2002	December 6, 2010	2	Democratic	Term limited
12		Kevin B. Kamenetz	December 6, 2010	May 10, 2018	1 1/2	Democratic	Died in office
Acting		Frederick J. Homan (Acting)^{2}	May 10, 2018	May 29, 2018	Partial	Democratic	Succeeded the County Executive seat as County Administrative Officer following the death of Kamenetz
13		Donald I. Mohler, III	May 29, 2018	December 3, 2018	Partial	Democratic	Appointed by the Baltimore County Council to fill the remainder of Kamenetz's term
14		Dr. John A. "Johnny O" Olszewski, Jr.	December 3, 2018	January 3, 2025	1 1/2	Democratic	Ran successfully for a seat in the US House of Representatives
Acting		D'Andrea Walker (Acting)^{4}	January 3, 2025	January 7, 2025	Partial	Democratic	Succeeded the County Executive seat as County Administrative Officer following the resignation of Olszewski.
15		Katherine A. Klausmeier	January 7, 2025	Incumbent	1/2	Democratic	Appointed by the Baltimore County Council to fill the remainder of Olszewski's term

== County executive-elect ==
#	Portrait	Executive-elect	Entering office	Party
16	Julian Jones smiling in 2026	Julian Jones	December 5, 2026	Democratic

== Notes ==
- ^1 Acting county executive after the conviction and resignation of Anderson
- ^2 Acting county executive after the death of Kamenetz
- ^3 Appointed to fill remainder of Kamenetz's term
- ^4 Acting county executive after the resignation of Olszewski
