= Timonium, Maryland =

- Census-designated place
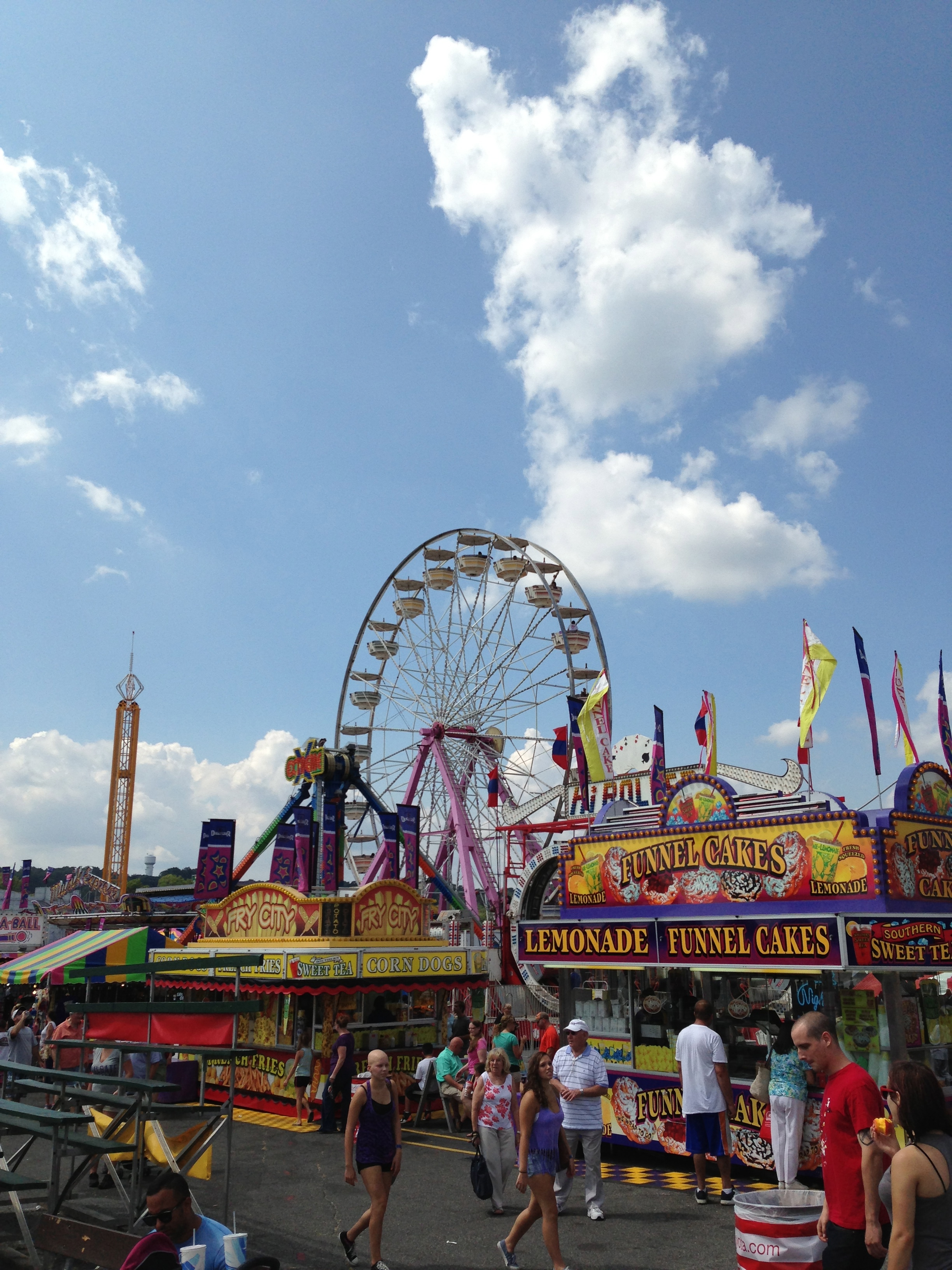
- The Maryland State Fair in Timonium

- Location of Timonium, Maryland
- Coordinates: 39°26′26″N 76°37′34″W
- Country: United States
- State: Maryland
- County: Baltimore

Area
  - Total: 6.54 sq mi (16.95 km^{2})
  - Land: 5.72 sq mi (14.82 km^{2})
  - Water: 0.82 sq mi (2.13 km^{2})

Population (2020)
  - Total: 10,458
  - Density: 1,828.1/sq mi (705.82/km^{2})
- Time zone: UTC−5 (Eastern (EST))
  - Summer (DST): UTC−4 (EDT)
- ZIP Codes: 21093-21094
- Area codes: 410, 443
- FIPS code: 24-78050

Timonium /ˌtɪˈmoʊniːəm/ is a census-designated place (CDP) in Baltimore County, Maryland, United States. As of the 2020 census, it has a population of 10,458. Prior to 2010 the area was part of the Lutherville-Timonium CDP.

The Maryland State Fair is held in Timonium each year near Labor Day on the grounds of the former Timonium Race Course, which is an important site along with Pimlico Race Course in northwest Baltimore and Laurel Park in Prince George's County, along with other former tracks at Bowie and Rosecroft in Maryland thoroughbred horse racing traditions.

== Etymology ==
Timonium takes its name from the Timonium Mansion, the home of Mrs. Archibald Buchanan, who, in melancholia due to the loss of eyesight and the death of a close friend, felt her life was like that of Mark Antony after the Battle of Actium. The original Timonium was an incomplete palace Mark Antony built on the island of Antirhodos in the harbor of Alexandria, Egypt. Antony died by suicide at the palace after receiving a false report that Cleopatra had died by suicide.

== Geography ==
Timonium is at 39°26′26″N 76°37′34″W (39.4441, −76.6076). According to the United States Census Bureau, the CDP has a total area of 5.4 square miles (13.9 km^{2}), all land.

The town is north of Baltimore along York Road (Maryland Route 45). It is bordered on the north by Cockeysville, on the south by Lutherville, on the east by Loch Raven Reservoir, and on the west by Falls Road (Maryland Route 25), with the Greenspring and Worthington Valleys beyond. Ridgely Road forms the boundary between Timonium and Lutherville, while Padonia Road separates Timonium from Cockeysville.

Timonium is in the Piedmont region of the United States, and is in the transition zone between the Humid subtropical climate zone to the south and the humid continental climate to the north, with hot and humid summers leading into winters that are cold but not extreme by American standards. The average annual snowfall is 25 inches (64 cm) and average annual rainfall is 42 inches (107 cm).

== Demographics ==
Historical population
Census	Pop.	Note	%±
1960	12,265		—
1970	24,055		96.1%
1980	17,854		−25.8%
1990	16,442		−7.9%
2000	15,814		−3.8%
2010	9,925		−37.2%
2020	10,458		5.4%
Separated from Lutherville-Timonium CDP in 2010 Census

Timonium first appeared as a census designated place in the 2010 U.S. census after the Lutherville-Timonium CDP was split into the Timonium CDP and the Lutherville CDP.

=== Racial and ethnic composition ===
Timonium CDP, Maryland – Racial and ethnic composition Note: the US Census treats Hispanic/Latino as an ethnic category. This table excludes Latinos from the racial categories and assigns them to a separate category. Hispanics/Latinos may be of any race.
Race / Ethnicity (NH = Non-Hispanic)	Pop 2010	Pop 2020	% 2010	% 2020
White alone (NH)	8,360	7,978	84.23%	76.29%
Black or African American alone (NH)	333	521	3.36%	4.98%
Native American or Alaska Native alone (NH)	4	8	0.04%	0.08%
Asian alone (NH)	768	1,065	7.74%	10.18%
Native Hawaiian or Pacific Islander alone (NH)	4	0	0.04%	0.00%
Other race alone (NH)	16	24	0.16%	0.23%
Mixed race or Multiracial (NH)	146	341	1.47%	3.26%
Hispanic or Latino (any race)	294	521	2.96%	4.98%
Total	9,925	10,458	100.00%	100.00%

=== 2020 census ===
As of the 2020 census, Timonium had a population of 10,458. The median age was 47.9 years. 19.6% of residents were under the age of 18 and 28.1% of residents were 65 years of age or older. For every 100 females there were 86.2 males, and for every 100 females age 18 and over there were 82.8 males age 18 and over.

99.2% of residents lived in urban areas, while 0.8% lived in rural areas.

There were 3,735 households in Timonium, of which 30.7% had children under the age of 18 living in them. Of all households, 57.8% were married-couple households, 13.1% were households with a male householder and no spouse or partner present, and 24.7% were households with a female householder and no spouse or partner present. About 24.3% of all households were made up of individuals and 14.0% had someone living alone who was 65 years of age or older.

There were 3,932 housing units, of which 5.0% were vacant. The homeowner vacancy rate was 1.1% and the rental vacancy rate was 9.3%.

== Transportation ==
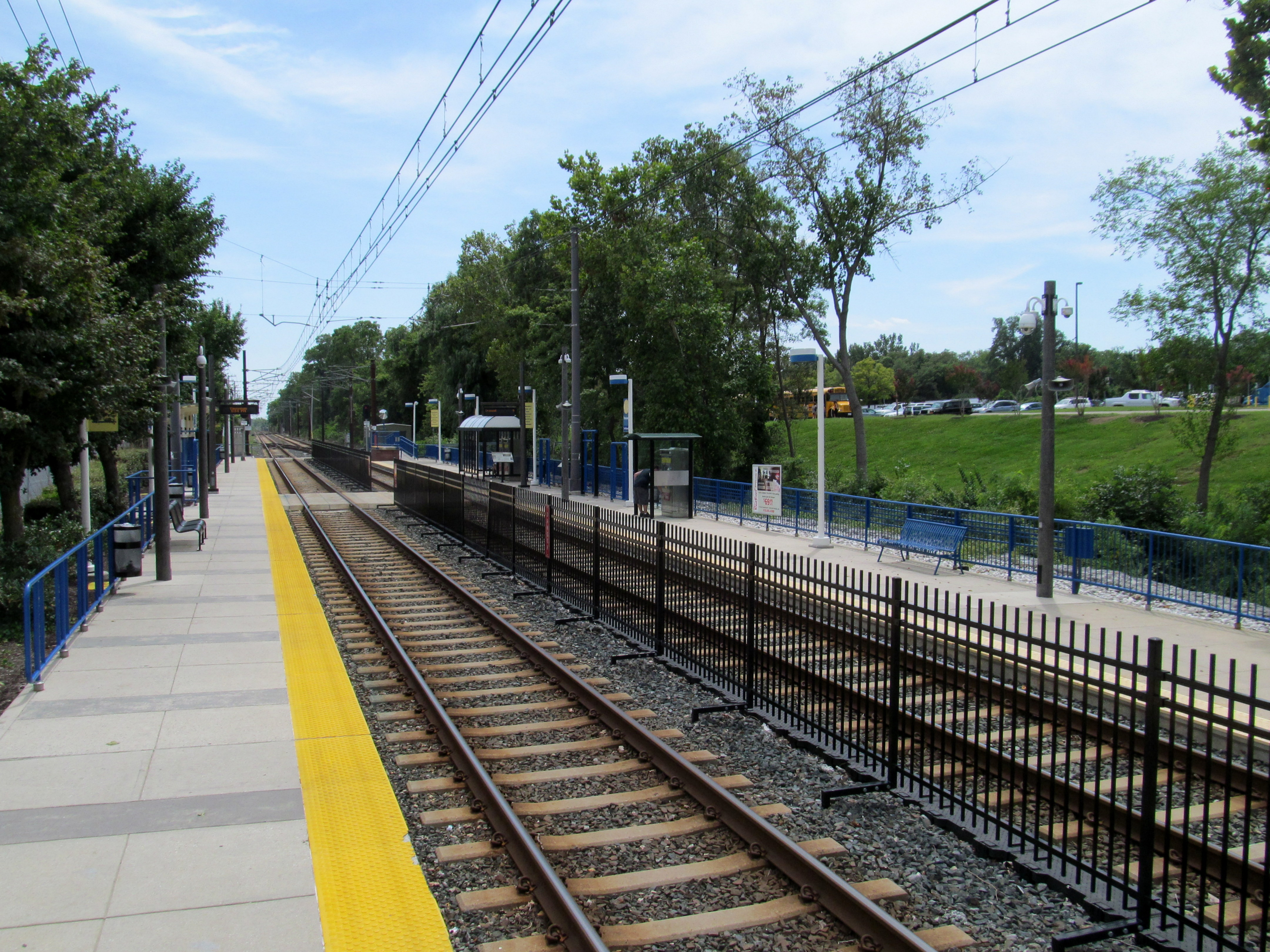
Timonium Fairgrounds station

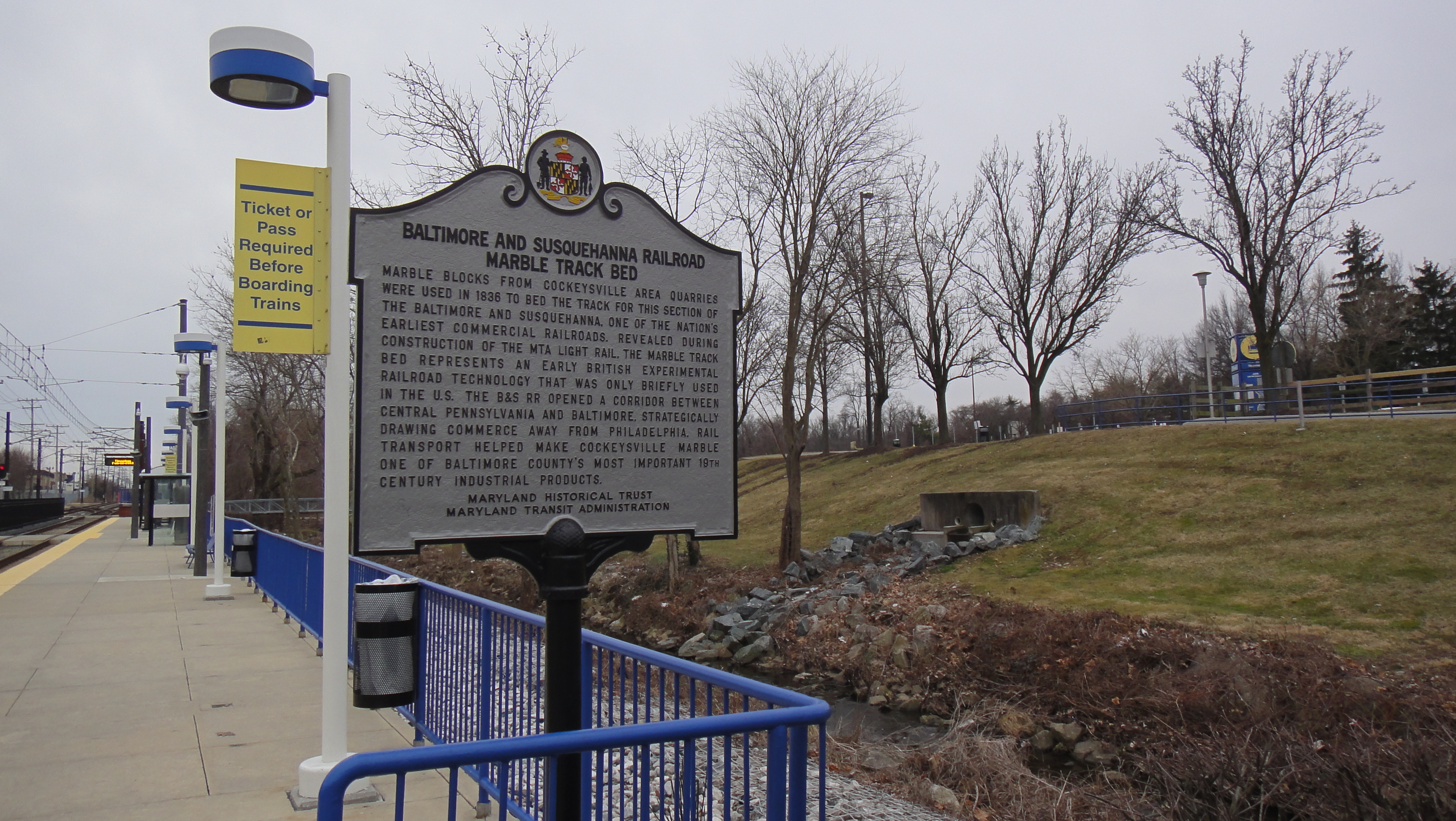
Baltimore and Susquehanna Railroad historical marker, Timonium light rail station

=== Roads ===
Major roads in the Timonium area include:

- Deereco Road/Greenspring Drive
- Dulaney Valley Road (MD-146)
- Pot Spring Road
- Timonium Road
- York Road (MD-45)
- Padonia Road
- Ridgely Road
- Mays Chapel Road
- Eastridge Road

=== Public transportation ===
The Maryland Transit Administration's light rail line has two stops in the Timonium area: Timonium and Fairgrounds. In addition, bus routes 8 and 9 provide regular service along the York Road corridor.

== Notable people ==
- Spiro T. Agnew (1918–1996), former U.S. Vice President and Governor of Maryland (plus Baltimore County Executive), buried in Timonium
- Mark Belanger (1944–1998), Baltimore Orioles shortstop
- Helen Bentley, politician
- William C. Bilo, United States Army brigadier general and deputy director of the Army National Guard
- Grafton Marsh Bosley (1825–1901), physician, philanthropist, planner, politician, and co-founder of the Maryland State Fair.
- Beth Botsford (born 1981), Olympic champion swimmer
- Robert Ehrlich, 60th Governor of Maryland. He was a resident of Timonium while serving in Congress as a Representative in the House of Representatives (although raised in Arbutus which he often cited).
- Jim Gentile (born 1934), former Baltimore Orioles first baseman.
- Rob Hiaasen, journalist and editor who was killed in the Capital Gazette shooting.
- Spencer Horwitz (born 1997), Major League Baseball first baseman for the Toronto Blue Jays then the Pittsburgh Pirates.
- Pam Shriver (born 1962), tennis player, Olympic champion, ranked as high as world No. 3 in singles, and world No. 1 in doubles.
- Don Shula (1930–2020), former Baltimore Colts player and coach in the 1960s, later famous coach of the Miami Dolphins, undefeated champions in 1972 in the National Football League, member of the Pro Football Hall of Fame.
- Dick Szymanski (1932–2021), former Baltimore Colts player.
- Gus Triandos (1930–2013), Baltimore Orioles catcher in the 1950s; Triandos Drive is named in honor of him.
- Johnny Unitas (1933–2002), former Baltimore Colts quarterback and Pro Football Hall of Fame in the National Football League; buried at Dulaney Valley Memorial Gardens.
- Cheryl Wheeler (born 1951), folk singer.
- Reid Wiseman (born 1975), NASA astronaut and commander of the Artemis II mission.

== Education ==
Public schools

- Pinewood Elementary School
- Pot Spring Elementary School
- Timonium Elementary School
- Ridgely Middle School (in Lutherville)
- Dulaney High School
