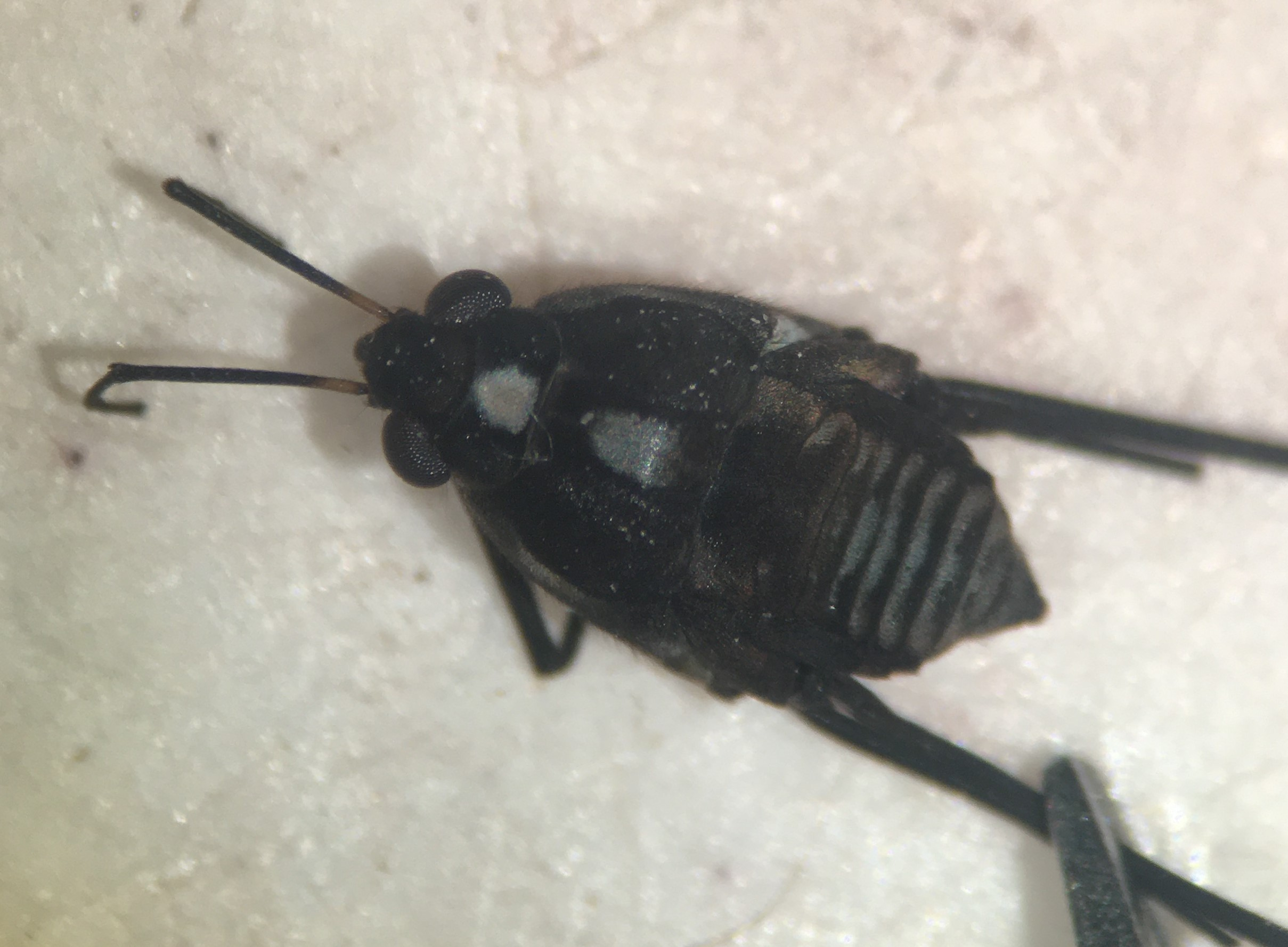

Scientific classification
- Domain: Eukaryota
- Kingdom: Animalia
- Phylum: Arthropoda
- Class: Insecta
- Order: Hemiptera
- Suborder: Heteroptera
- Family: Gerridae
- Subfamily: Trepobatinae
- Genus: Metrobates; Uhler, 1871

Synonyms
- Trepobatopsis Champion, 1898

= Metrobates =

Genus of true bugs

Metrobates is a genus of water striders in the family Gerridae. There are about 16 described species in Metrobates.

== Species ==
These 16 species belong to the genus Metrobates:

- Metrobates alacris Drake, 1955
- Metrobates amblydonti Nieser, 1993-31
- Metrobates anomalus Hussey, 1948
- Metrobates artus Anderson, 1932
- Metrobates curracis Drake & Roze, 1954
- Metrobates denticornis (Champion, 1898)
- Metrobates fugientis Drake & Harris, 1945-01
- Metrobates hesperius Uhler, 1871
- Metrobates laetus Drake, 1954
- Metrobates laudatus Drake & Harris, 1937
- Metrobates plaumanni Hungerford, 1951-01
- Metrobates porcus Anderson, 1932
- Metrobates sanciprianensis Castro-Vargas, Morales & Molano-Rendón, 2018
- Metrobates trux (Torre-bueno, 1921)
- Metrobates tumidus Anderson, 1932
- Metrobates vigilis Drake, 1958-01
