= Oncotylus guttulatus =

Scientific classification
- Kingdom: Animalia
- Phylum: Arthropoda
- Class: Insecta
- Order: Hemiptera
- Suborder: Heteroptera
- Family: Miridae
- Subfamily: Phylinae
- Tribe: Phylini
- Genus: Oncotylus
- Species: O. guttulatus

Binomial name
- Oncotylus guttulatus Uhler, 1894

Species of true bug

Oncotylus guttulatus is a species of plant bug in the family Miridae. It is found in Central America and North America.
