= Ridgely Middle School =

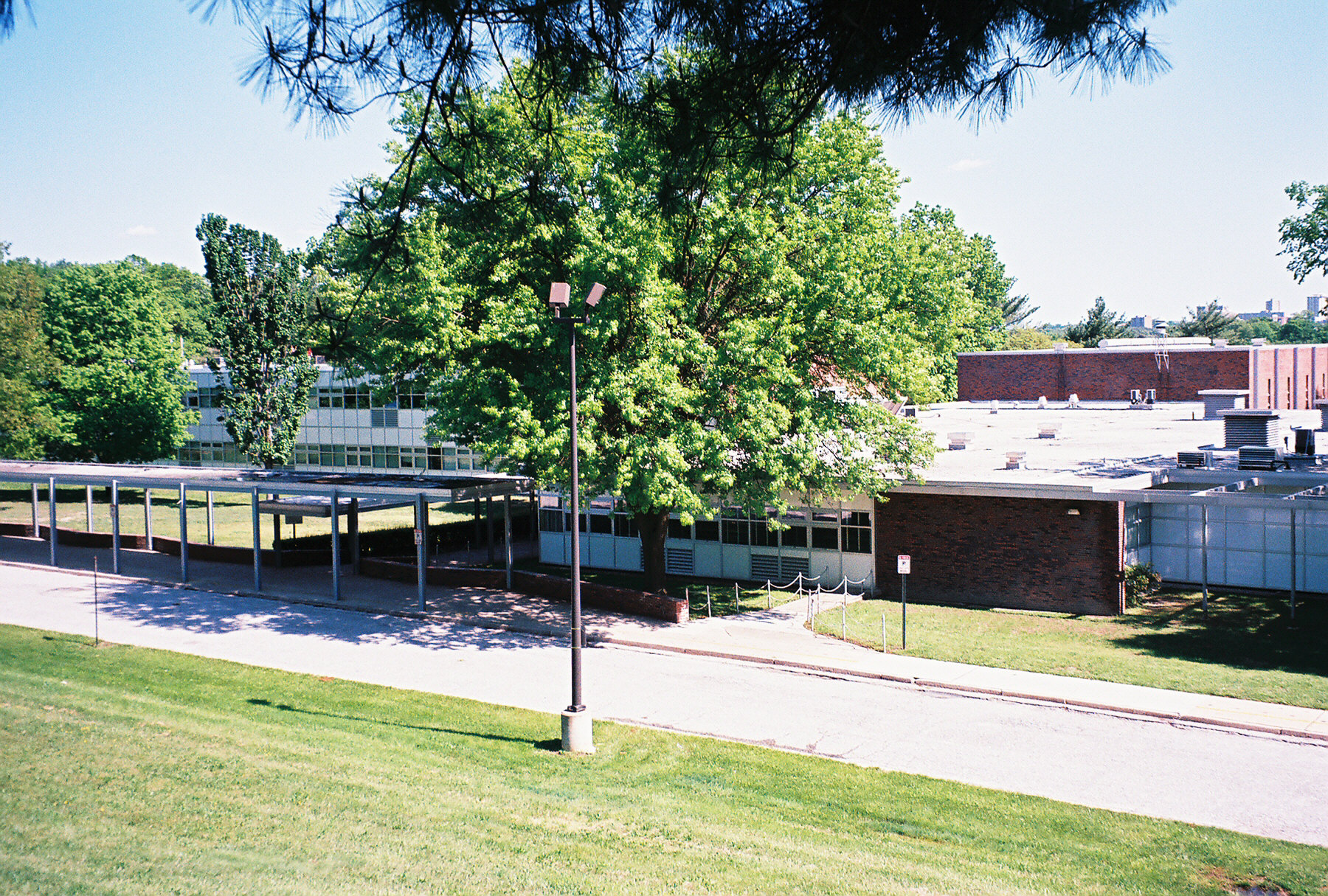
- North elevation view

Location
- 121 E. Ridgely Road; Lutherville-Timonium, Maryland 21093; United States
- Coordinates: 39°25′52″N 76°36′49″W

Information
- Status: Blue Ribbon School
- Principal: Seth Barish
- Faculty: 62.0 (on FTE basis)
- Grades: 6-8
- Enrollment: 1,233 (as of 2016–17)
- Student to teacher ratio: 16.31
- Colors: Red & Black
- Mascot: Stag
- Website: Ridgely Middle School

Ridgely Middle School is a Blue Ribbon-award-winning middle school that serves students in sixth through eighth grades as part of the Baltimore County Public Schools. This school serves students coming from elementary schools in Lutherville, Timonium, Hampton and Ruxton-Riderwood, Maryland.

As of the 2016–17 school year, the school had an enrollment of 1,233 students and ~75 classroom teachers (on a full-time equivalent or "FTE" basis), for a student-teacher ratio of 15.9.

== Courses ==
Course offerings provide a comprehensive program of general studies where all students are required to participate in specified subjects. At Ridgely, programs are offered to meet the needs of all students on a continuum ranging from Gifted and Talented Education to programs for students with specific learning disabilities. Starting in the 2020–21 school year, courses in Chinese, French, Latin and Spanish will be available to all grade levels.

Ridgely's Grade 8 Gifted and Talented oral history program has been recognized in a Spotlight on Innovative Teaching by the University of Maryland, Baltimore County and in authors Barry Lanman and Laura Wendling's anthology of oral history education.

== Awards and recognition ==
During the 2006–07 school year, Ridgely Middle School was recognized with the Blue Ribbon School Award of Excellence by the United States Department of Education, the highest award an American school can receive. Librarian Christine Beard won one of Baltimore County Chamber of Commerce's Annual Awards for Excellence in Education in May 2007. The Ridgely Chess team has also won the BCPS Chess Championships 2019.

== Feeder schools ==
Elementary schools that feed into Ridgely are:

- Carroll Manor Elementary
- Cromwell Valley Magnet School
- Hampton Elementary
- Lutherville Lab Elementary
- Pine Grove Elementary
- Pinewood Elementary
- Pot Spring Elementary
- Riderwood Elementary
- Timonium Elementary
- Mays Chapel Elementary

Ridgely students elevate into the following high schools:

- Dulaney High School
- Loch Raven High School
- Towson High School
- Magnet program

== Building Renovation ==
A $14 million renovation project was substantially completed in 2008, including new energy-efficient windows, ceilings, lighting, remodeled bathrooms, and doors. In the 2008–09 school year, rooms and doors were repainted. The 19-year-old roof was also replaced, and four of five temporary classroom trailers were removed, due to increased space in the building.

Since the renovation work was completed, parents have complained that air conditioning should have been included in the project scope. Responding to a large demonstration by parents at the county seat in Towson on September 15, 2009, elected officials called for an investigation into complaints about ventilation and temperature conditions at the school, which parents attribute to the installation of the energy-efficient window system. Parents say the partially sealed windows provide insufficient outside air ventilation in the non-air conditioned school.

Temperatures of over 105 degrees have been recorded inside the school. While administrative offices are air-conditioned, classrooms are not. As a result of the heat, students have experienced nausea, aggravated asthma, and even vomiting. In 2007, one student was taken by ambulance from Ridgely to Greater Baltimore Medical Center after he became dehydrated in class.
