= Lutherville-Timonium, Maryland =

- Former census-designated place
- Location of Lutherville-Timonium, Maryland
- Coordinates: 39°26′11″N 76°37′6″W
- Country: United States
- State: Maryland
- County: Baltimore

Area
  - Total: 7.4 sq mi (19.1 km^{2})
  - Land: 7.4 sq mi (19.1 km^{2})
  - Water: 0 sq mi (0.0 km^{2})

Population (2000)
  - Total: 15,814
  - Density: 2,142/sq mi (827.1/km^{2})
- Time zone: UTC−5 (Eastern (EST))
  - Summer (DST): UTC−4 (EDT)
- ZIP codes: 21093-21094
- Area codes: 410, 443
- FIPS code: 24-48900

Lutherville-Timonium was a census-designated place (CDP) in Baltimore County, Maryland, United States, for the 2000 census. At that time the population was 15,814. For the 2010 census the area was split into two CDPs, the unincorporated communities of Lutherville and Timonium. Within its borders lies the Lutherville Historic District. The Maryland State Fair is held in Timonium each year near Labor Day.

== Geography ==
Lutherville-Timonium is located at 39°26′11″N 76°37′6″W (39.436456, −76.618461).

According to the United States Census Bureau, the CDP had a total area of 7.4 square miles (19 km^{2}), all of it land.

== Demographics ==
Historical population
Census	Pop.	Note	%±
1960	12,265		—
1970	24,055		96.1%
1980	16,871		−29.9%
1990	16,442		−2.5%
2000	15,814		−3.8%

As of the census of 2000, there were 15,814 people, 6,485 households, and 4,461 families residing in the CDP. The population density was 2,142.1 people per square mile (827.1 people/km^{2}). There were 6,614 housing units at an average density of 895.9 units per square mile (345.9 units/km^{2}). The racial makeup of the CDP was 90.10% White, 3.22% African American, 0.15% Native American, 5.27% Asian, 0.01% Pacific Islander, 0.24% from other races, and 1.01% from two or more races. Hispanic or Latino of any race were 1.22% of the population.

There were 6,485 households, out of which 24.7% had children under the age of 18 living with them, 59.4% were married couples living together, 7.1% had a female householder with no husband present, and 31.2% were non-families. 26.3% of all households were made up of individuals, and 14.7% had someone living alone who was 65 years of age or older. The average household size was 2.36 and the average family size was 2.86.

In the CDP, the population was spread out, with 19.7% under the age of 18, 4.9% from 18 to 24, 24.6% from 25 to 44, 27.0% from 45 to 64, and 23.7% who were 65 years of age or older. The median age was 46 years. For every 100 females there were 90.1 males. For every 100 females age 18 and over, there were 87.5 males.

The median income for a household in the CDP was $61,573, and the median income for a family was $74,464. Males had a median income of $52,401 versus $35,132 for females. The per capita income for the CDP was $32,369. About 0.8% of families and 3.6% of the population were below the poverty line, including 0.6% of those under age 18 and 5.1% of those age 65 or over.
