= Oncotylus punctipes =

Scientific classification
- Kingdom: Animalia
- Phylum: Arthropoda
- Class: Insecta
- Order: Hemiptera
- Suborder: Heteroptera
- Family: Miridae
- Genus: Oncotylus
- Species: O. punctipes

Binomial name
- Oncotylus punctipes (Reuter, 1875)

Species of plant bug

Oncotylus punctipes is a species of plant bugs belonging to the family Miridae, subfamily Phylinae. It is found in Benelux, Czech Republic, Germany, France, Moldova, North Macedonia, Poland, Romania, Slovakia, Slovenia, Ukraine, and Scandinavia.
