= Oncotylus nigricornis =

Scientific classification
- Kingdom: Animalia
- Phylum: Arthropoda
- Class: Insecta
- Order: Hemiptera
- Suborder: Heteroptera
- Family: Miridae
- Genus: Oncotylus
- Species: O. nigricornis

Binomial name
- Oncotylus nigricornis Saunders, 1876

Species of true bug

Oncotylus nigricornis is a species of plant bug belonging to the family Miridae, subfamily Phylinae that can be found in Croatia, France, Greece, Italy, North Macedonia and Spain.
