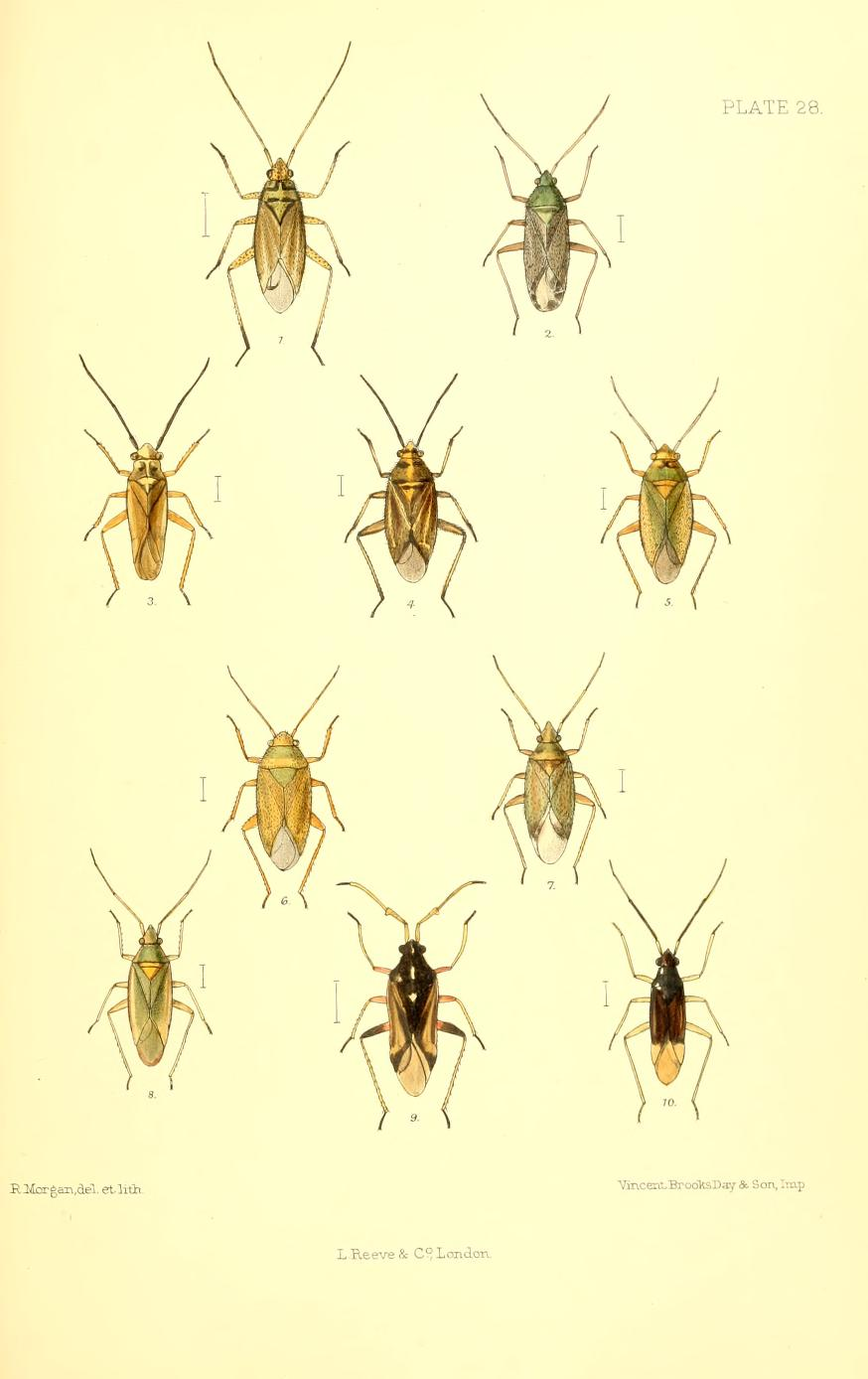
- Oncotylus viridiflavus depicted in Edward Saunders Hemiptera Heteroptera of the British Islands (figure 1)

Scientific classification
- Kingdom: Animalia
- Phylum: Arthropoda
- Class: Insecta
- Order: Hemiptera
- Suborder: Heteroptera
- Family: Miridae
- Genus: Oncotylus
- Species: O. viridiflavus

Binomial name
- Oncotylus viridiflavus (Goeze, 1778)

Synonyms
- Cimex viridiflavus Goeze, 1778

= Oncotylus viridiflavus =

Species of true bug

Oncotylus viridiflavus is a species of plant bugs belonging to the family Miridae, subfamily Phylinae. It is found in every country of Central, south Europe and Scandinavia.
