= Oncotylus vitticeps =

Scientific classification
- Kingdom: Animalia
- Phylum: Arthropoda
- Class: Insecta
- Order: Hemiptera
- Suborder: Heteroptera
- Family: Miridae
- Genus: Oncotylus
- Species: O. vitticeps

Binomial name
- Oncotylus vitticeps (Reuter, 1879)

Species of true bug

Oncotylus vitticeps is a species of plant bugs belonging to the family Miridae, subfamily Phylinae that can be found in Russia and Ukraine.
