= Oncotylus pyrethri =

Scientific classification
- Kingdom: Animalia
- Phylum: Arthropoda
- Class: Insecta
- Order: Hemiptera
- Suborder: Heteroptera
- Family: Miridae
- Genus: Oncotylus
- Species: O. pyrethri

Binomial name
- Oncotylus pyrethri (Becker, 1864)

Species of true bug

Oncotylus pyrethri is a species of plant bugs belonging to the family Miridae, subfamily Phylinae that is found in Russia and Ukraine.
