= Maryland State Fair =

Annual event held in Baltimore County, Maryland, U.S.

Coordinates: 39°26′41″N 76°37′48″W

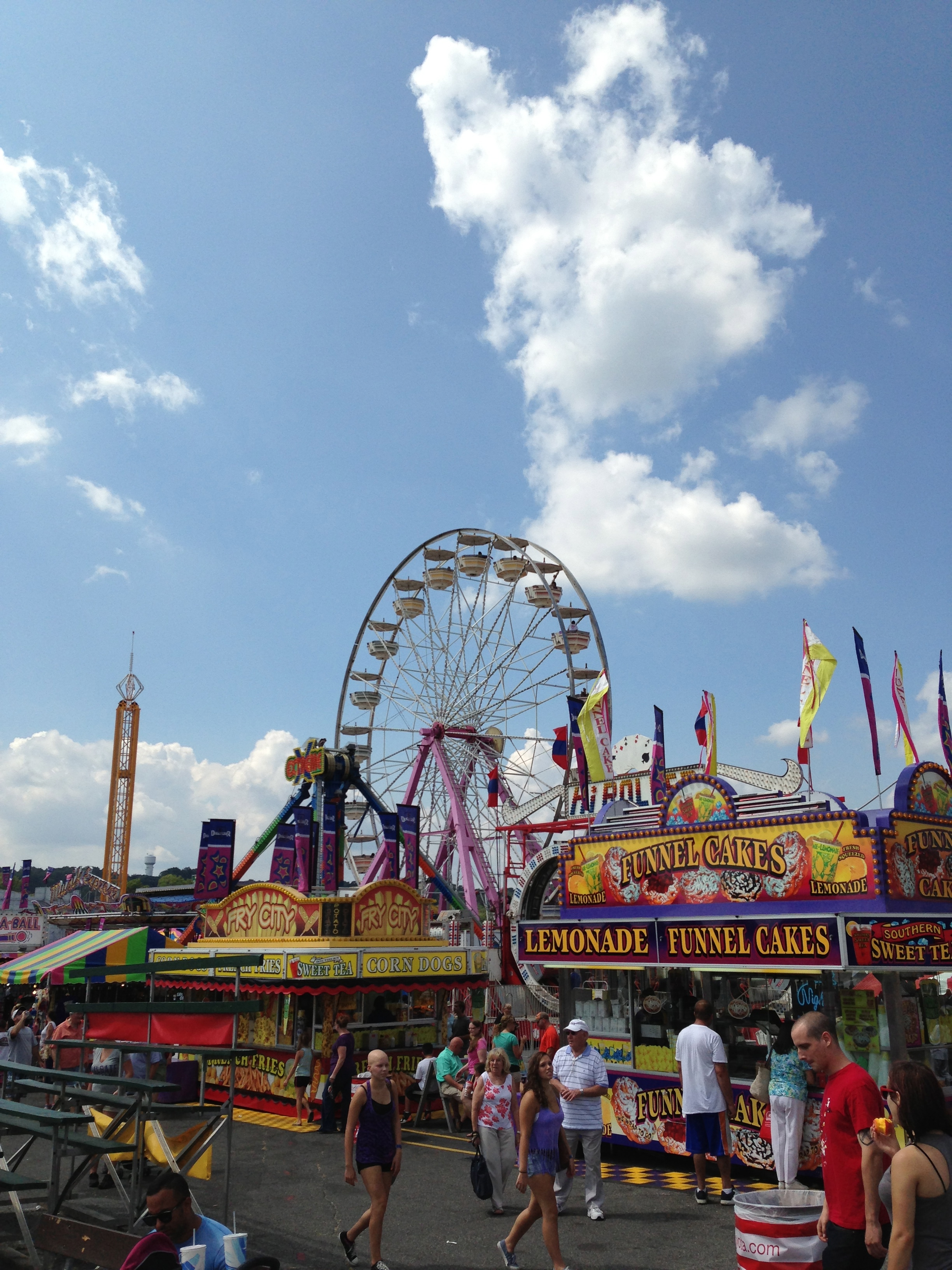
Maryland State Fair in September 2013

The Maryland State Fair is an annual event held in the state of Maryland. It is hosted at the Maryland State Fairgrounds, located near York and Timonium roads in Baltimore County. As of 2006, the fair has been traditionally scheduled for a duration of 11 days, typically beginning in late August and concluding around Labor Day.

== History ==
On September 17, 1878, Grafton Marsh Bosley hosted a series of contests and a ball to benefit yellow fever sufferers at his property north of Towson. The following year, the fair was moved to its current location in Timonium and was held from September 9 through September 12. In 1906, the Lutherville Fair merged with the Pimlico Fair and became what is known now as the Maryland State Fair. The fair was suspended from 1943 through 1945 during World War II. In 1999, the fair increased its functionality to 11 days.

The New York Times reported that on October 14, 1870, President Rutherford B. Hayes would go to Frederick to attend the "Maryland State Fair." In 1878, after several unsuccessful attempts to establish an ongoing fair at other locations around Baltimore, a group of Maryland businessmen operated a successful fair on a 4-acre (16,000 m^{2}) site in Lutherville, Maryland. Despite its success, the Lutherville Fair was short-lived because an extension of the Northern Central Railroad (the former Baltimore and Susquehanna Railroad) was being constructed through the middle of the fairgrounds.

Their success in Lutherville, however, gave the operators resolve to establish an annual fair, and in December 1878, they incorporated as the Agricultural Society of Baltimore County. The corporation leased a 37-acre (150,000 m^{2}) plot of land on the old Baltimore and York Turnpike on what was then known as "the Timonium Estate." The first fair was held at its new home September 9–12, 1879. The Northern Central Railroad, the reason behind the closure of the Lutherville Fair, was now the primary source of transportation for fairgoers from Baltimore City to the south to the Timonium Fairgrounds during the rest of the century. Other fairgoers walked or rode horses, wagons, carriages, and carts to the fairgrounds using the Turnpike and its southern end of Greenmount Avenue. Later visitors used the old #8 electric street car line of the old United Railway and Electric Company, known after 1935 as the Baltimore Transit Company. After the last street car rode its course down York Road and Greenmount Avenue to Catonsville in 1963, diesel buses brought visitors to the fair in addition to the thousands of cars parked on acres of lots around the grounds for that last week of summer.

Late in the century, the Agricultural Society of Baltimore County faced stiff competition from the nearby Pimlico Fair, also referred to as "the State Fair." Ultimately, the two groups held joint fairs in 1894 and 1897, and in 1906, merged to form one corporation— the Maryland State Fair and Agricultural Society of Baltimore County, Maryland. Their annual fair then became known as "The Maryland State Fair."

The early years at the Fair saw tents and wooden structures in use to exhibit home arts, farm and garden products, and livestock shows. Plowing and working oxen competitions were some of the popular but few attractions. Races were held at the track, and results were forwarded to interested horsemen at Baltimore and Alexandria, Virginia, by way of carrier pigeon. Food concessions consisted of sandwiches made by the farmers’ wives, and amusements involved sideshows, sack races, and greased pole climbing.

The Maryland State Fair grew and prospered, adding many attractions and exhibits, including an airmail delivery at the 1918 Fair. The annual event continued until 1943 when the fair was interrupted because of the war effort in World War II. The fairgrounds were leased to the U.S. Army for a storage depot and a vehicle repair center. After a three-year suspension, the fair reopened its gates in 1946.

In 1999, the fair added another day, making the fair now an 11-day event.

In 2020, the fair was restricted to private livestock and other virtual shows due to the COVID-19 pandemic.

== Timonium Race Track ==
Timonium Race Track
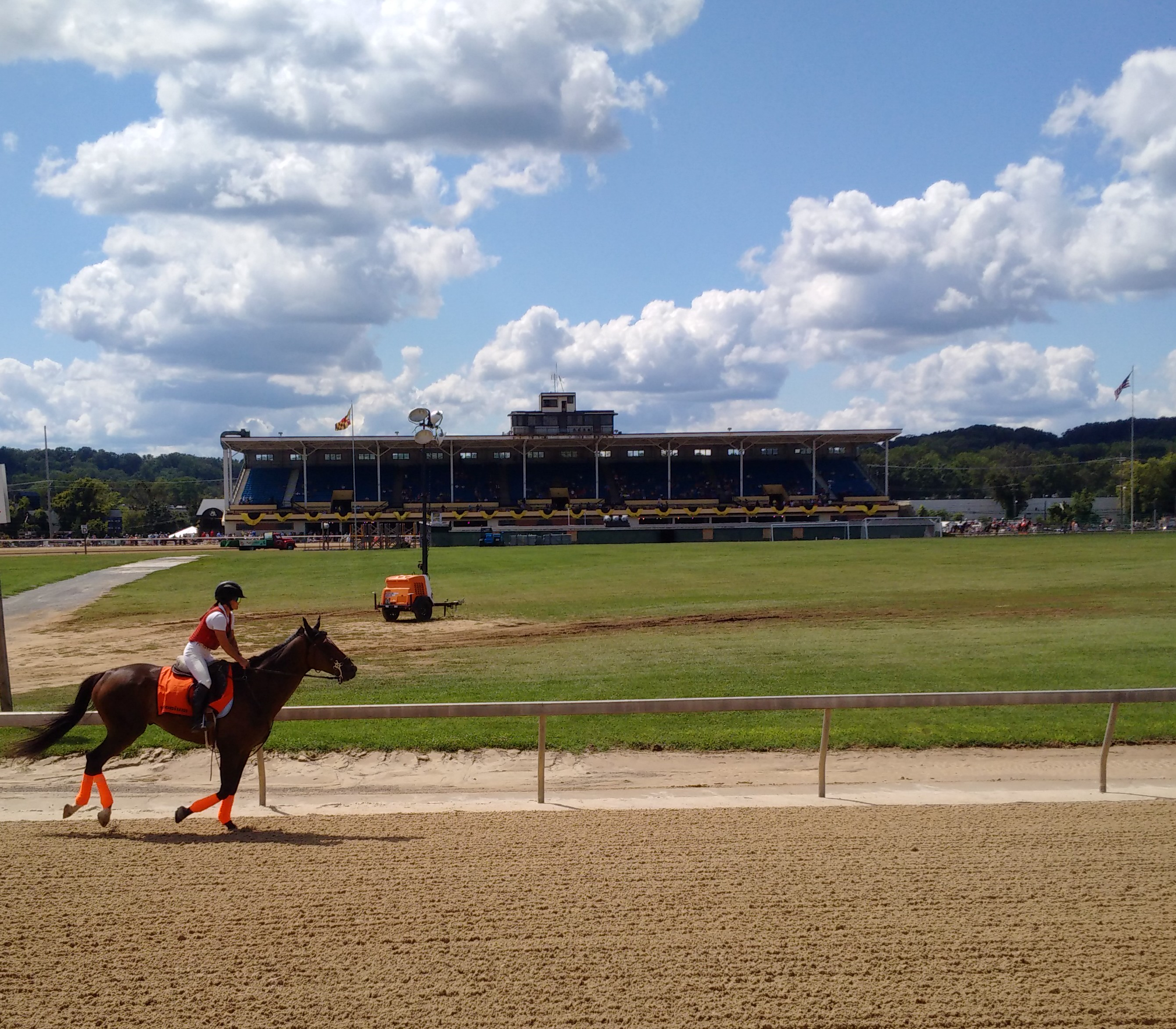
- Interactive map of Timonium Race Track
- Location: Maryland State Fair, at York Road & Timonium Road, Timonium, Maryland, United States
- Owned by: Maryland State Fair & Agricultural Society, Inc.
- Date opened: September 9, 1879
- Course type: Flat
- Notable races: "Alma North Stakes" "Taking Risks Stakes"

In the 1950s, growth in population and development in increasingly suburban Baltimore County flourished, and certain business interests wanted to purchase the fairgrounds site for industrial development. The majority stockholder of the Corporation for the M.S.F. & A.S. of B.C., which was now the Maryland Jockey Club (which also owned and operated the famous Pimlico Race Course in northwest Baltimore, and home to the Preakness Stakes—one of thoroughbred horse racing's "Triple Crown"—had agreed to sell. In the ensuing controversy, however, a group of agriculturists, business leaders, horsemen, and bankers formed the "Save the Maryland State Fair Committee." The Committee raised over $600,000 to purchase the fairgrounds, ensuring that The Maryland State Fair at Timonium would continue to be Maryland's premiere event at the end of each summer.

Another crisis was averted in the 1970s. The organized Maryland racing industry took steps to have the fair's thoroughbred racing competition dates transferred to other Maryland tracks in order to re-trench a declining audience, purses, and media attention. Fair directors recognized that such a move would threaten the survival of the fair. The "Committee of Friends of the Maryland State Fair" was established to strengthen the cooperation between Maryland agriculture and horse breeding interests—a relationship that had been a tradition in the state since the mid-18th century. The committee was successful in convincing the public and the state legislature in the Maryland General Assembly of the value in keeping thoroughbred racing a part of the fair. The committee also prepared expansion plans for the fair, which resulted in a $5 million grant from the State of Maryland for building, modernization, and year-round use of the fairgrounds.

One of the most famous horses to race at Timonium was the Maryland-bred colt Bee Bee Bee who competed and won in the fall of 1971. Then in May 1972 at Pimlico Race Course, Bee Bee Bee won the second leg of the U.S. Triple Crown series, the Preakness Stakes.

Currently the racetrack hosts events during the fair, including the "Alma North Stakes" for fillies and mares and the Taking Risks Stakes.

== Miss Maryland Agriculture Program ==
The Miss Maryland Agriculture Program (MMAP) has been a feature of the Maryland State Fair since the 1930s. The name of the contest has changed several times throughout the decades. When it began, the winner received the title Miss Timonium Fair, but winners have also been given the title of Farm Queen, and now the winner receives the title of Miss Maryland Agriculture.

According to Phyllis McKenzie, the 2012 Miss Maryland Agriculture winner, the program is a, "knowledge contest run through the farm bureau program. [The judges] will be looking for a lot of knowledge in all the diversities of agriculture and the Maryland Farm Bureau throughout their policies and many programs that they offer for farmers and other agriculturalists."

== Light rail service ==
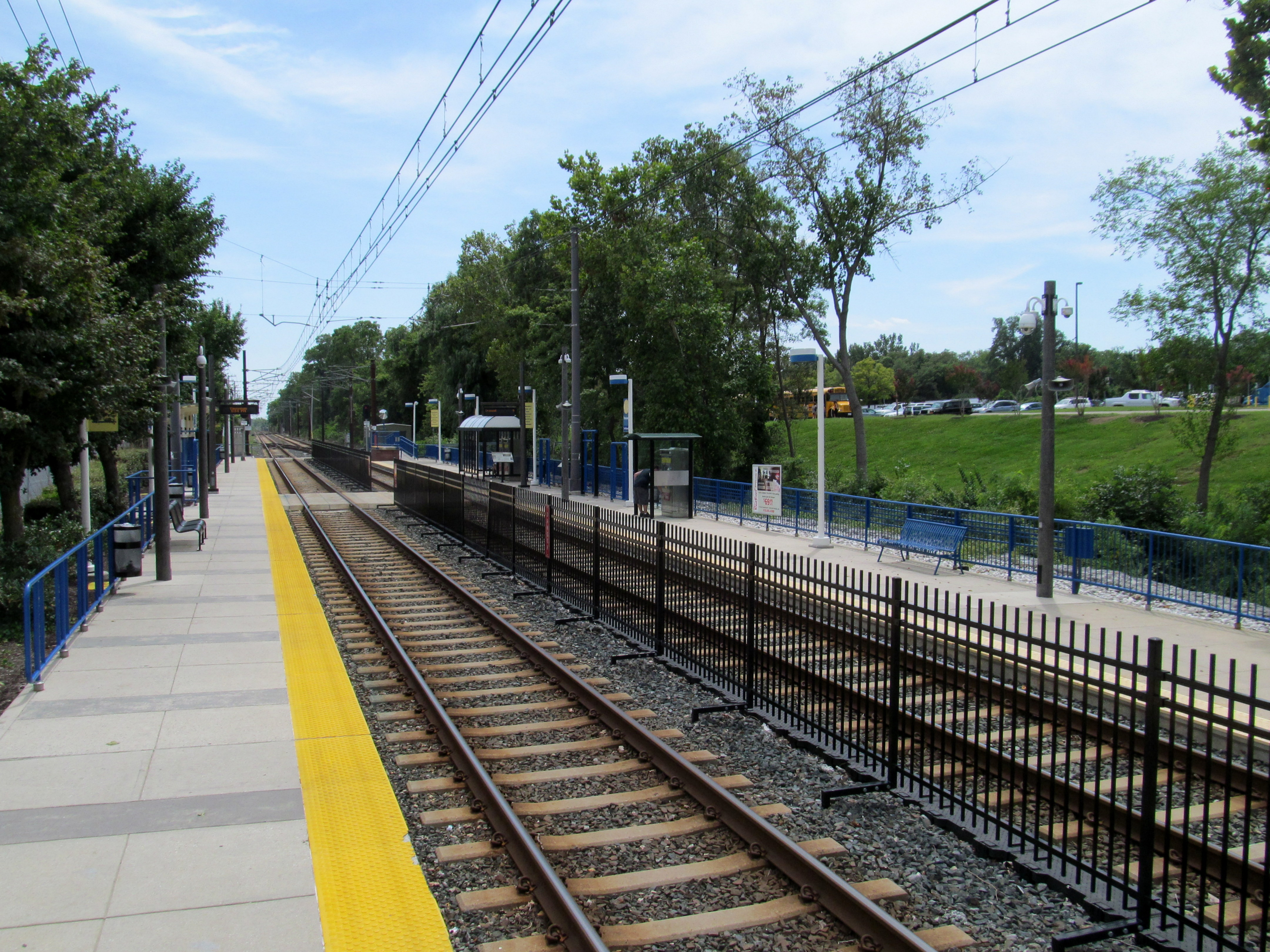
Fairgrounds station

In the early 1990s, construction was completed on the Baltimore Light Rail line, serving Glen Burnie station near Glen Burnie in Anne Arundel County to the south, downtown Baltimore, and Hunt Valley to the north. The light rail line's Fairgrounds station is adjacent to the fair's west entrance. It resulted in increasing crowds of visitors arriving by rail in the late 20th and early 21st Centuries, just like a century earlier with the old street cars (of the old United Railways and Electric Company, later the Baltimore Transit Company) and the commuter trains of the old Northern Central Railway.
