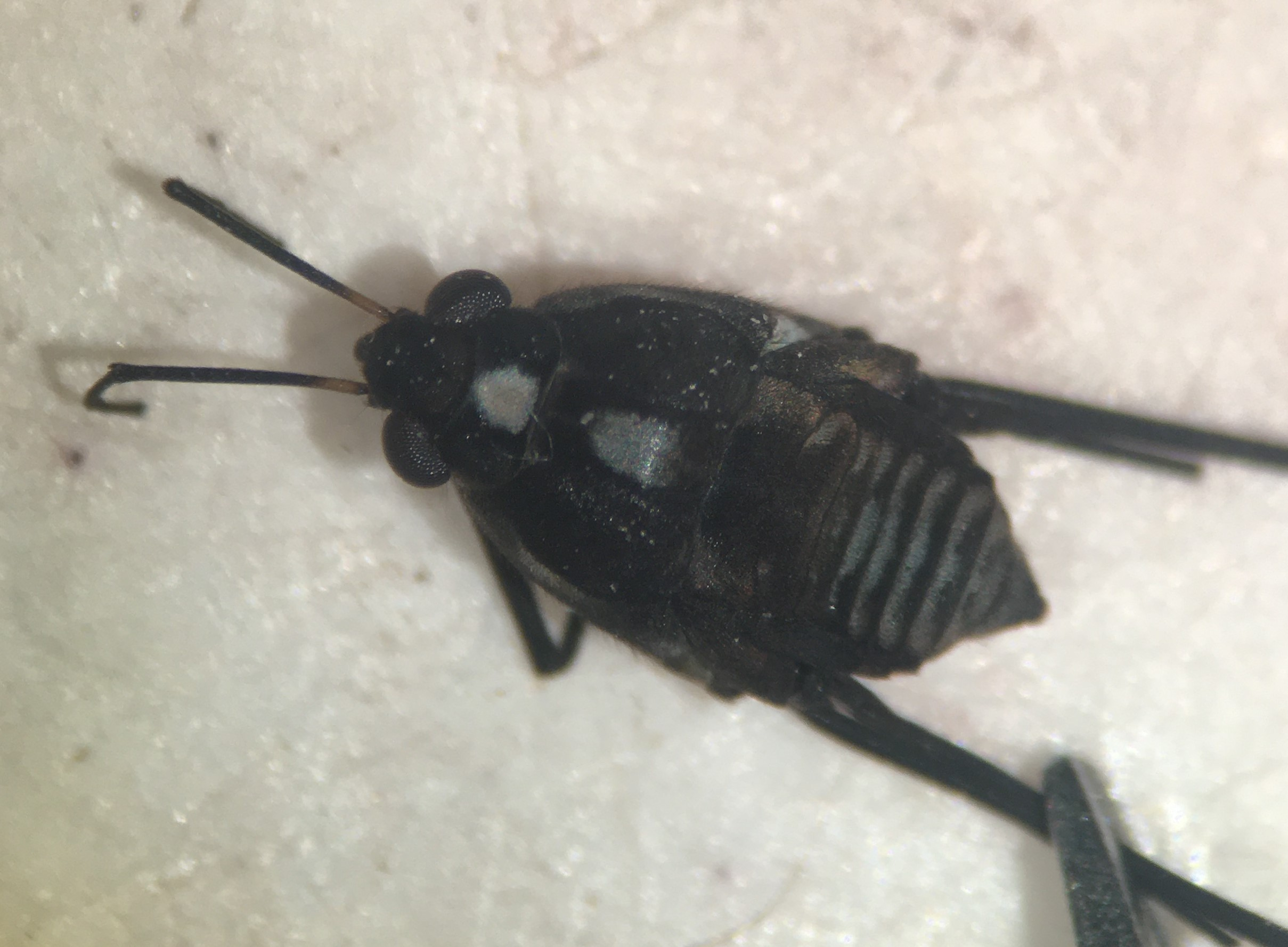

Scientific classification
- Domain: Eukaryota
- Kingdom: Animalia
- Phylum: Arthropoda
- Class: Insecta
- Order: Hemiptera
- Suborder: Heteroptera
- Family: Gerridae
- Genus: Metrobates
- Species: M. hesperius

Binomial name
- Metrobates hesperius Uhler, 1871

= Metrobates hesperius =

Species of true bug

Metrobates hesperius is a species of water strider in the family Gerridae. It is found in eastern North America.

== Subspecies ==
These three subspecies belong to the species Metrobates hesperius:

- Metrobates hesperius depilatus Hussey & Herring, 1949
- Metrobates hesperius hesperius Uhler, 1871
- Metrobates hesperius ocalensis Hussey & Herring, 1949
