= Maryland College for Women =

Defunct college in Maryland, US

Coordinates: 39.42215°N 76.62772°W

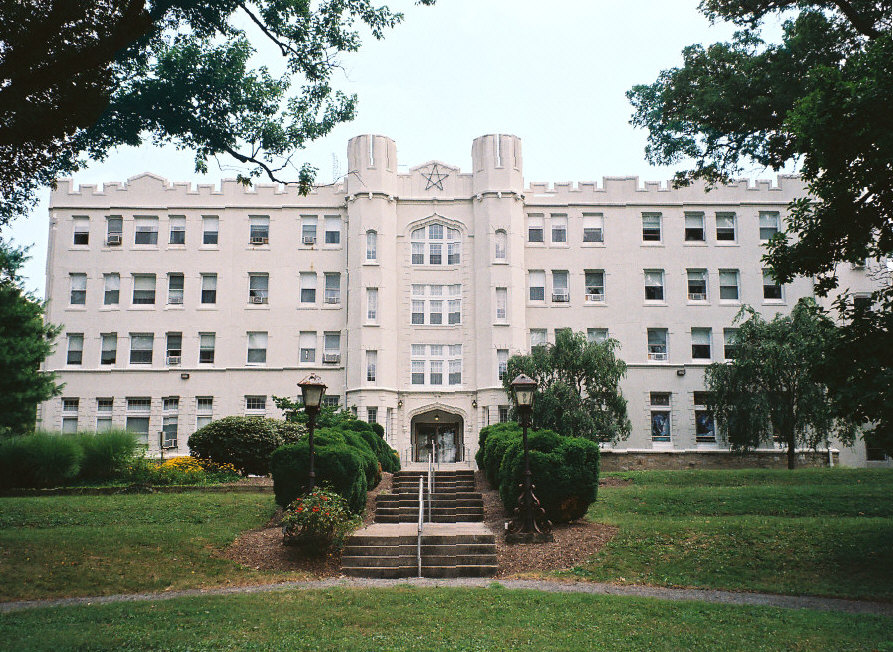
Maryland College for Women, 1911 building

Maryland College for Women was a college for women in Lutherville, Maryland. It was founded in 1853 as the Lutherville Female Seminary. It was the centerpiece of the planned community of Lutherville, created by two Lutheran ministers, Benjamin Kurtz and John Morris, and named for theologian Martin Luther.

The school building was a large limestone building with two wings and a 96-foot observatory, designed by the architecture firm of Dixon, Balbirnie, and Dixon. Classes began in October 1854, and included art, chemistry, modern and classical languages, mathematics, music, natural sciences, and needlework. Morris wrote that the curriculum would "embrace everything necessary to a solid and finished literary education."

Morris sold the school to J. H. Turner in April 1886. The school was renamed the Maryland College for Women in 1895. Charles Wesley Gallagher served as president from 1908 until his death in 1916. In 1911, the College burned down and was replaced by a white stucco building. In the 1920s, the parents of actors Warren Beatty and Shirley MacLaine met on the campus of the Maryland College for Women, where they were both instructors.

In 1952, the Maryland College for Women closed and became College Manor, a senior citizen's home.

== See also ==
- List of women's universities and colleges in the United States
- Baltimore Female College
- Goucher College
