= Grafton Marsh Bosley =

American physician, philanthropist, planner (1825–1901)

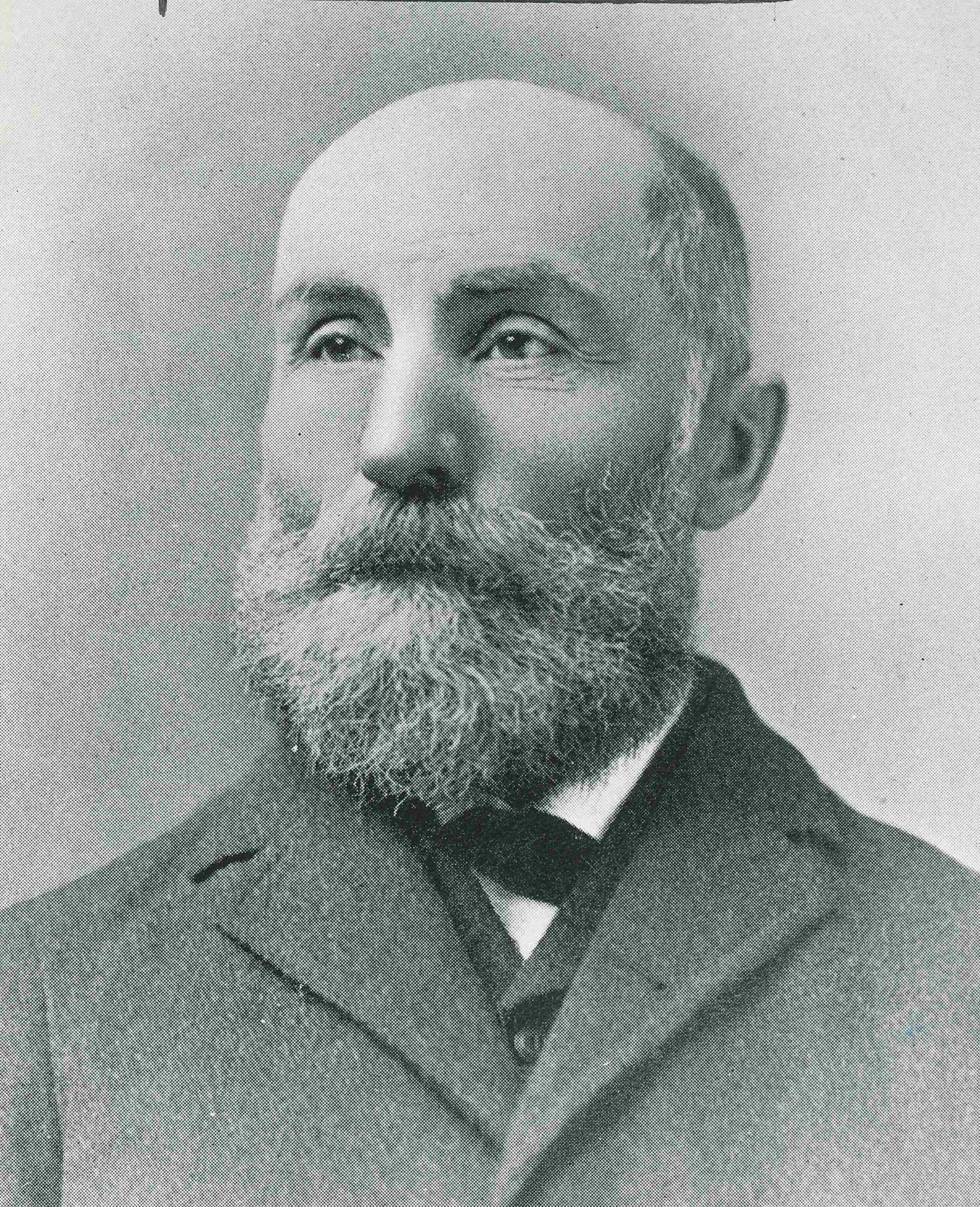
- Born: March 8, 1825; Baltimore, Maryland, U.S
- Died: January 25, 1901 (aged 75); Baltimore, Maryland, U.S
- Education: University of Maryland Medical School

Grafton Marsh Bosley (March 8, 1825 – January 25, 1901) was a physician, philanthropist, planner, and politician. He was the son of Amon Bosley and Rebecca Marsh Bosley. He attended Dickinson College and University of Maryland Medical School. He married Margaretta M. Nicholson on May 5, 1857, and they had a single son, Arthur L. Bosley, before his wife's death in 1885.

== Early life ==
The family of G.M. Bosley settled in Baltimore County during the 1600s. His oldest known relative is James H. Bosley of Staffordshire, England, who moved to St John's Parish, Baltimore County, Province of Maryland, and who had one son, Walter Clifton Bosley. The Bosley home was located on the York Road, approximately 11 miles north of Towsontowne. G.M. Bosley's early education took place in the local schoolroom. His father was a wealthy farmer, landowner, and lime manufacturer. Upon his father's death, Bosley was sent to Baltimore to continue his education, and then sent to the Episcopal High School in Virginia. Later, he went to Dickinson College in Pennsylvania. For graduate study, he entered the University of Maryland Medical School in Baltimore, where he got practical experience assisting the city poorhouse's physician.

== Career ==
Grafton Bosley finally settled in Towson in 1848, where he formed a medical partnership with his uncle, Josiah Marsh. After his uncle died in 1850, Bosley continued managing the practice for several years, then devoted his work to his real estate holdings, his church's activities, the Independent Order of Odd-Fellows, and was involved in local politics.

In 1854, Bosley sold 50 acres (20 ha) to a development group from Pennsylvania which improved the area west of York Road with new avenues, trees, and boardwalks. The buildings in this area included the Smedley House, which was a hotel that became popular when Towson became the county seat.

== Towson life ==
Josiah Marsh was the owner of a 140-acre (57 ha) estate, which Bosley inherited in 1850 upon his uncle's death. The property includes current-day West Towson. Rather than occupy the inherited Marsh homestead, Dr. Bosley built his home on a selected site that is now the Southland Hills neighborhood. This 25-room mansion that he called "Uplands" appears on the Bromley 1898 atlas plate 22 of 9th & 11th districts, and was created in the middle of a twenty-five-acre park known as "The Highlands". Bosley lived there until he fell ill just before his death in 1901. Colonel Milton W. Offutt purchased the Bosley estate on Chesapeake Avenue for the sum of $17,500 and exchanged for the Offutt Home.

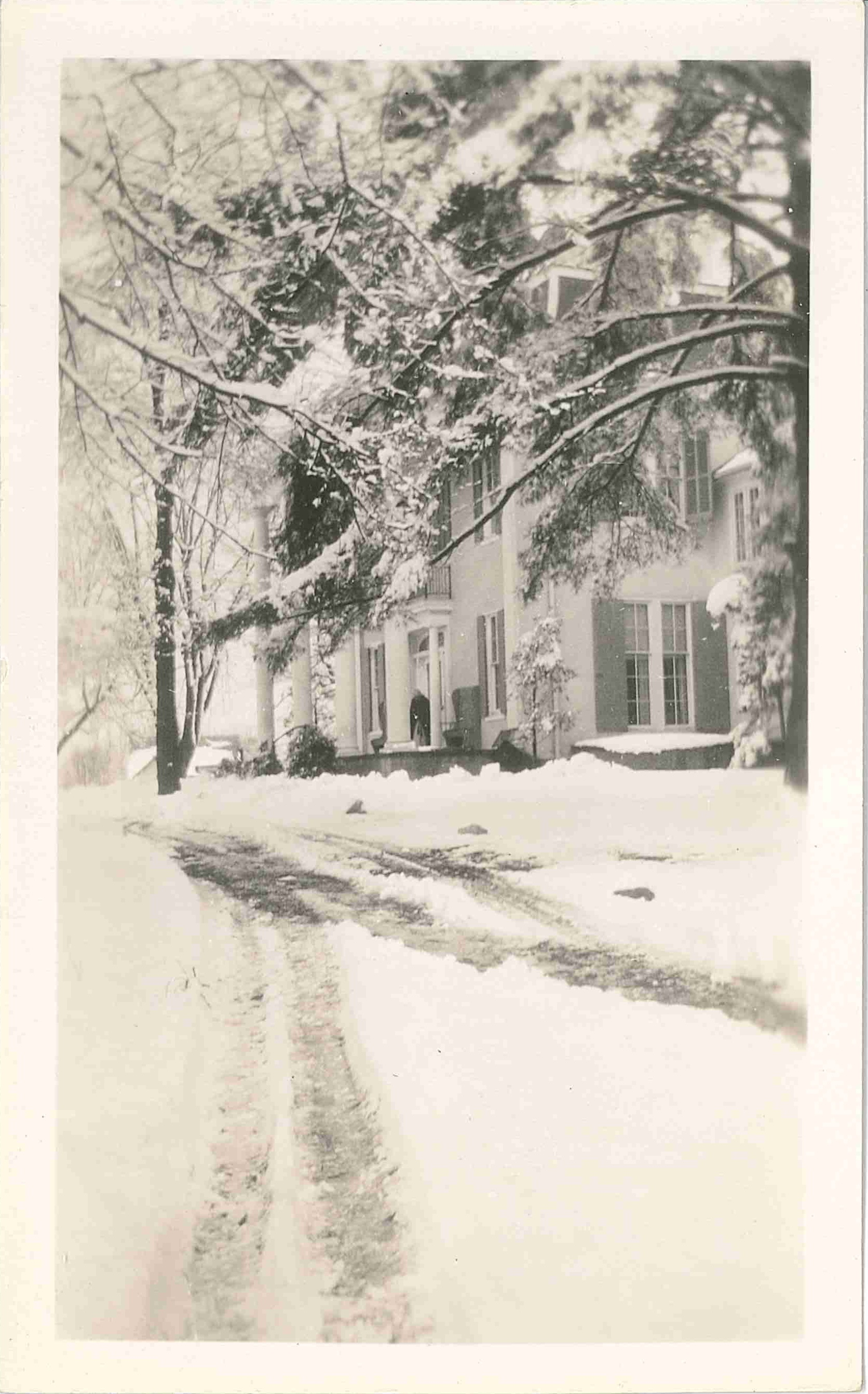
Bosley Mansion as the newly converted Presbyterian Home

== Philanthropy and politics ==
Following division of Baltimore County from the city of Baltimore on July 1, 1851, a referendum of county voters in 1853 and ratification on February 13, it was decided in 1854 that the County Seat and site of the new county courthouse would be in Towson. Dr. Bosley and other large landowners, namely Henry Chew, Benjamin Payne, and John Carnan Ridgely, the governor's son. All offered land and improvements to influence the vote for Towson. Bosley Avenue is named for Dr. Bosley who ultimately donated part of his land for the Towson Courthouse in 1852 and for the Baltimore County Jail in Towson. The first group of County commissioners independent of Baltimore City, which became the Baltimore County Council, were Joshua Hutchins, Edward Myers, Joseph Pope, William Slater and Charles Timanus. They held their meetings, typically a dinner and discussion, at Dr. Bosley's mansion in West Towson. Bosley was party to finance discussions related to who could buy or sell notes related to the erection of the new public buildings required in Towson. Dr. Bosley was also a founding member of the Towson Odd Fellows organization, which is over 160 years old, and he served as its first Noble Grand. He was an original trustee of the Epsom Chapel, which was Towson's first church, and was a member of the vestry of the Trinity Episcopal Church, having donated the land for its rectory.

== State fair ==
Grafton Bosley also inherited from his father a tenant farm with a mansion north of Towsontowne, which was known as Belle Field or, more recently, as the Timonium Mansion. The property had a one mile (1.6 km) racetrack where he began hosting annual charity fairs. On Tuesday, September 17, 1878, Dr. Bosley hosted and served as Chairman of Arrangements for a series of contests and ball to benefit yellow fever sufferers at his property in Ridgely's Woods. The event organization was known as Baltimore County Grange and was attended by over 1000 and raised over $150. After his death, the fair continued to be run by Baltimore County Grange. Dr. Bosley was a founder and incorporator of The Agricultural Society of Baltimore County. The event became the official Maryland State Fair in 1937.

== Death ==
Grafton Bosley died at Church Home and Infirmary and was buried at Prospect Hill Cemetery in Towson, Maryland.
