= Oncotylus punctiger =

Scientific classification
- Kingdom: Animalia
- Phylum: Arthropoda
- Class: Insecta
- Order: Hemiptera
- Suborder: Heteroptera
- Family: Miridae
- Genus: Oncotylus
- Species: O. punctiger

Binomial name
- Oncotylus punctiger (Reuter, 1894)

Species of true bug

Oncotylus punctiger is a species of plant bugs belonging to the family Miridae, subfamily Phylinae that is endemic to Spain.
