= Oncotylus setulosus =

Scientific classification
- Kingdom: Animalia
- Phylum: Arthropoda
- Class: Insecta
- Order: Hemiptera
- Suborder: Heteroptera
- Family: Miridae
- Genus: Oncotylus
- Species: O. setulosus

Binomial name
- Oncotylus setulosus (Herrich-Schäffer, 1837)

Species of true bug

Oncotylus setulosus is a species of plant bugs belonging to the family Miridae, subfamily Phylinae. It is found in Austria, Bulgaria, Czech Republic, France, Germany, Hungary, Moldova, Romania, Slovakia, Spain, Ukraine, and all states of former Yugoslavia (except for Croatia).
