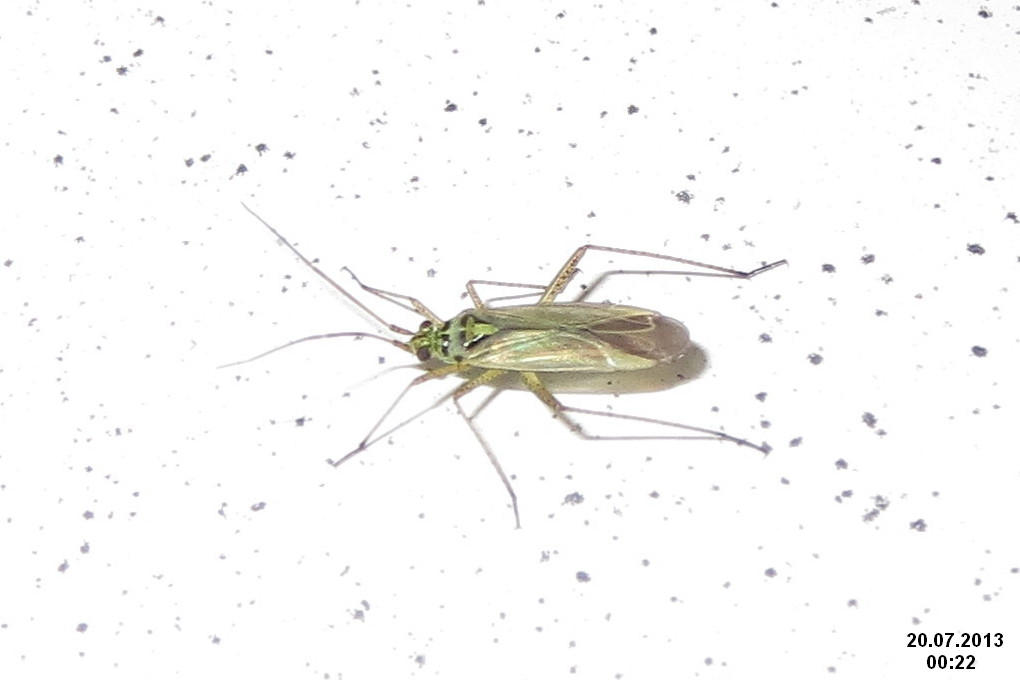
- Oncotylus viridiflavus

Scientific classification
- Kingdom: Animalia
- Phylum: Arthropoda
- Clade: Pancrustacea
- Class: Insecta
- Order: Hemiptera
- Suborder: Heteroptera
- Family: Miridae
- Subfamily: Phylinae
- Tribe: Phylini
- Genus: Oncotylus; Fieber, 1858

= Oncotylus =

Genus of true bugs

Oncotylus is a genus of plant bugs in the family Miridae. There are at least 20 described species in Oncotylus.

== Species ==
These 20 species belong to the genus Oncotylus:

- Oncotylus affinis Jakovlev, 1882
- Oncotylus anatolicus Wagner, 1969
- Oncotylus basicornis Horváth, 1901
- Oncotylus bolivari Reuter, 1900
- Oncotylus desertorum Reuter, 1879
- Oncotylus ferulae V.Putshkov, 1975
- Oncotylus guttulatus Uhler, 1894
- Oncotylus horvathi Reuter, 1901
- Oncotylus innotatus Wagner, 1969
- Oncotylus longicornis Wagner, 1969
- Oncotylus nigdensis Linnavuori, 1961
- Oncotylus nigricornis Saunders, 1876
- Oncotylus persicus Reuter, 1879
- Oncotylus punctiger Reuter, 1894
- Oncotylus punctipes Reuter, 1875
- Oncotylus pyrethri (Becker, 1864)
- Oncotylus reuteri Reuter, 1879
- Oncotylus setulosus (Herrich-Schaeffer, 1837)
- Oncotylus viridiflavus (Goeze, 1778)
- Oncotylus vitticeps Reuter, 1879
