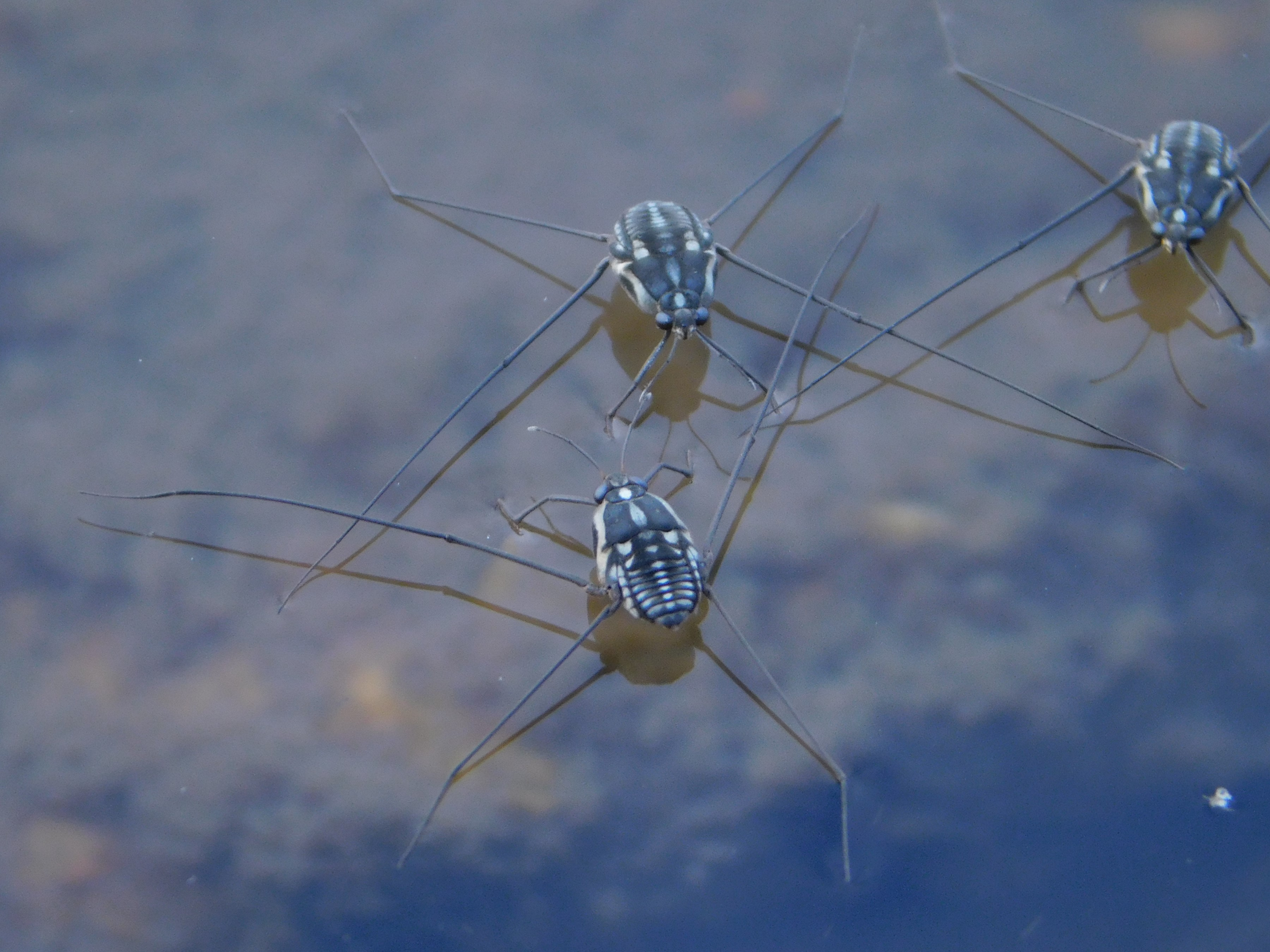

Scientific classification
- Domain: Eukaryota
- Kingdom: Animalia
- Phylum: Arthropoda
- Class: Insecta
- Order: Hemiptera
- Suborder: Heteroptera
- Family: Gerridae
- Genus: Metrobates
- Species: M. trux

Binomial name
- Metrobates trux (Torre-bueno, 1921)

= Metrobates trux =

Species of true bug

Metrobates trux is a species of water strider in the family Gerridae. It is found in western North America.

== Subspecies ==
These two subspecies belong to the species Metrobates trux:

- Metrobates trux infuscatus Usinger, 1953
- Metrobates trux trux (Torre-Bueno, 1921)
