= John Gottlieb Morris =

American entomologist

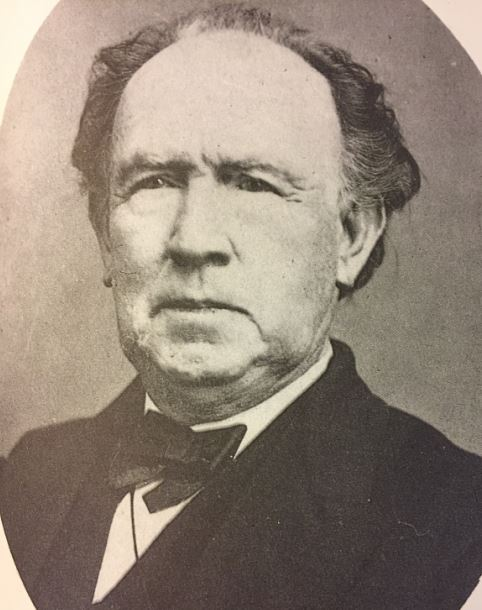
- Born: November 14, 1803; York
- Died: October 10, 1895 (aged 91)
- Alma mater: Dickinson College; Princeton Theological Seminary
- Occupation: Pastor; librarian
- Employer: Peabody Institute

John Gottlieb Morris (November 14, 1803 – October 10, 1895) was a Lutheran minister who played an influential role in the evolution of the Lutheran church in America. He was also an early American entomologist and one of the first to specialize in the study of Lepidoptera (butterflies and moths).

== Biography ==
Morris was born on November 14, 1803, in York, Pennsylvania. He was the youngest of nine children born to John Samuel Gottlieb Morris and Barbara Myers Morris. His father had emigrated from Germany in 1776 to fight in the American Revolution. His mother was from Baltimore County, Maryland. After the war, the senior Morris settled in York, married Barbara Myers and became a successful physician. Both parents were devout members of the Lutheran Church. Morris was baptized on January 8, 1804, in York's Christ Lutheran Church.

When Morris was five, his father died, leaving a substantial fortune to his wife and children. Morris' oldest brother, Charles, stepped in and became the boy's guardian. Morris studied first at York Academy, attended Princeton and then graduated from Dickinson College in 1823. He demonstrated a strong aptitude for language and became fluent in German, Greek, Latin, French, and Hebrew.

After graduation at the age of twenty, Morris decided to become a Lutheran minister. For two years he studied with Samuel Simon Schmucker, an influential but controversial Lutheran religious leader. He then studied at the Presbyterian Princeton Theological Seminary before finishing his training in 1826 at the new Lutheran Theological Seminary at Gettysburg. In October 1827, Morris was ordained in the Lutheran ministry and began serving as pastor of the First English Lutheran Church in Baltimore. Shortly after settling in Baltimore, Morris married Eliza Hay, member of a prominent New York family. They went on to have ten children, of whom four daughters survived to adulthood.

When Morris joined the clergy, Lutheranism faced an internal struggle between liberals who sought to align with mainstream American Protestantism and conservative German immigrants who wished to maintain their traditions and language. As pastor of First English for more than thirty years, Morris was a leading proponent of progressive, English-speaking Lutheranism in Baltimore. He also participated in inter-denominational efforts and became president of the Baltimore Ministerial Association. When he left his parish in 1860, he continued to serve on a part-time basis at St. Mark's and Third English, both in Baltimore. Morris was also active on state and national levels, serving seven times as president of the Maryland Synod and twice as president of the General Synod.

By 1860 Morris had served as pastor for 33 years and felt the need for a career change. He resigned his position and was appointed trustee for the new Peabody Institute. Later that same year he became the institution's first librarian, charged with building a collection that covered "every department of knowledge". Morris quickly put together a catalog of 50,000 volumes he wanted to obtain for the new library. By the time he left the library in 1867, he had acquired 20,000 titles. Even after his departure, the catalog continued to provide guidance for book acquisitions until 1916.

In addition to his religious work, Morris had a keen interest in science, education, and history. He was one of the earliest American entomologists to specialize in the study of butterflies. In 1842 he became a founding member of the Entomological Society of Pennsylvania, the first society in America devoted to entomology. In 1846 he toured Europe, meeting with European entomologists and viewing the insect collections at some of the major museums. In 1860 Morris published his Catalogue of the Described Lepidoptera of North America and followed with the Synopsis of the Described Lepidoptera of North America in 1862. These were the first catalogs of American butterflies written by an American. Morris also wrote and lectured extensively on the relationship between science and religion. Unlike many of his colleagues in American entomology, he never accepted Darwinism and instead remained a supporter of Georges Cuvier's catastrophism.

For many years Morris maintained a close relationship with the Lutheran Theological Seminary at Gettysburg and its sister institution, Pennsylvania College (now Gettysburg College). He was appointed director of the seminary in 1828 and eventually served ten terms for a total of 48 years. He participated in the establishment of the college in 1832 and served on the board of trustees for 54 years. He taught zoology and natural history at the college and lectured for many years at the seminary. In 1844 Morris organized the Linnaean Association, one of the first college natural history societies in the country. Morris also established the Lutherville Female Seminary (and the town of Lutherville) in 1853.

In 1851 Morris was elected to membership in the Maryland Historical Society, an organization that suited his scholarly interest in history. Over the next four decades he served the society in a number of different roles and was elected president in 1895. One of his chief contributions to the Society was the effort he led to expand and improve both the library and the natural history collections. By 1885 the library held over 25,000 volumes and the museum held a substantial collection representing the flora, fauna, and geology of Maryland. In 1886 Morris used his influence to encourage the creation of the Society for the History of the Germans in Maryland. Morris was elected president of the new society, a position he held until his death.

Morris was elected to the American Philosophical Society in 1893.

Morris died on October 10, 1895.

== Works ==
Morris was a prolific writer who published hundreds of books, pamphlets and articles on a number of subjects, including Martin Luther, the Reformation, German history, Maryland history, and the relation between science and religion. A few of his publications include:

- 1838 Geology and Revelation
- 1844 Necessities and Blessings of the Reformation
- 1846 Natural History as Applied to Farming and Gardening
- 1855 Martin Behaim, the German Astronomer
- 1860 Catalogue of the Described Lepidoptera of North America
- 1862 Synopsis of the Described Lepidoptera of North America
- 1874 The Lords of Baltimore
- 1882 Luther at Wartburg: A Reformation Story of 1521
- 1896 Life Reminiscences of an Old Lutheran Minister
