= Lutherville Historic District =

Historic district in Maryland, United States

- U.S. National Register of Historic Places
- U.S. Historic district
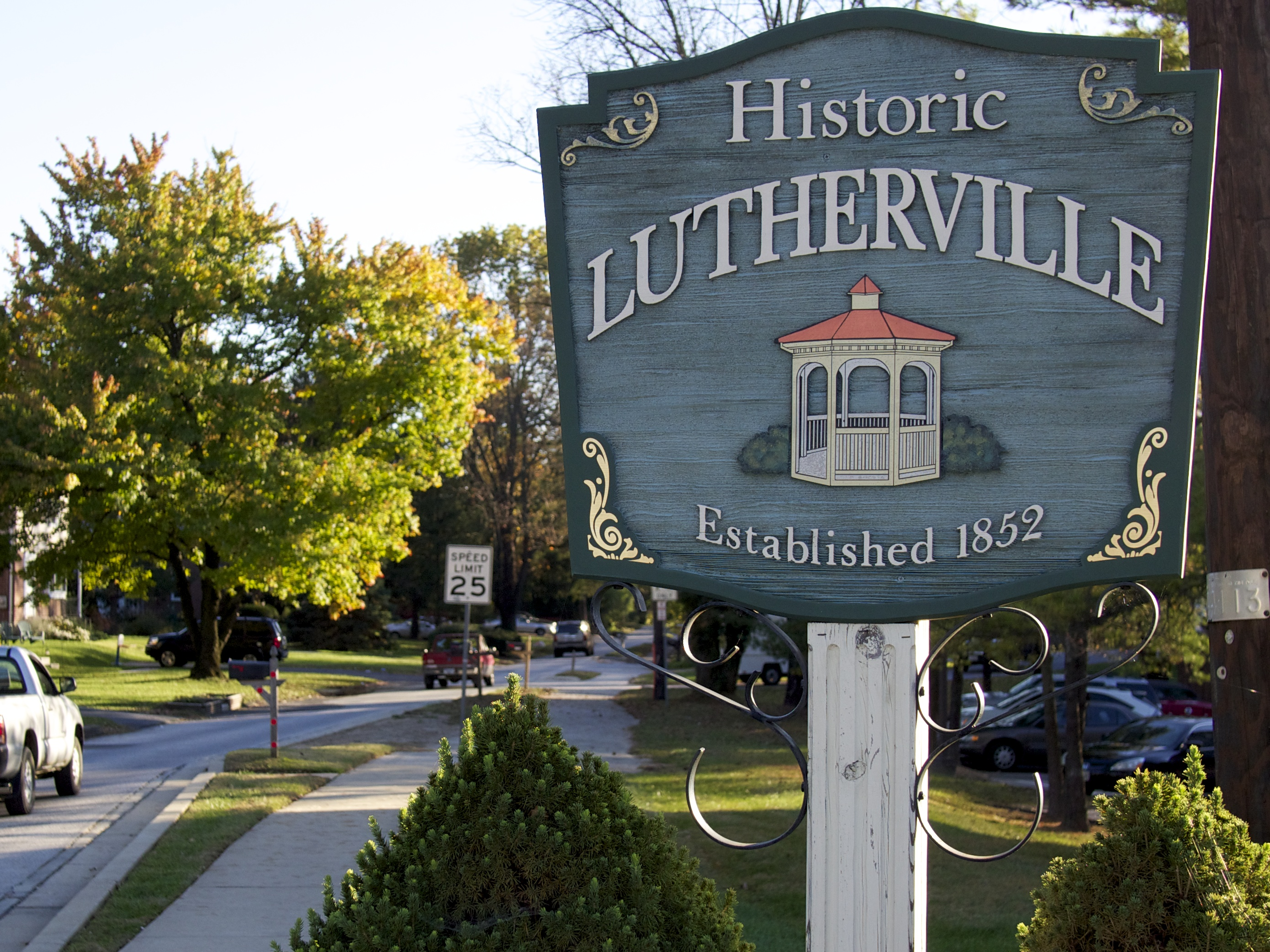
- One of several signs surrounding the Lutherville, Maryland Historic District. Taken on Kurtz Ave. just past Ridgely Rd.

- Location within Maryland Location within the United States
- Location: Roughly bounded by I 695, York and Ridgely Rds., and Lutherville Dr., Lutherville, Maryland
- Coordinates: 39°25′19″N 76°38′41″W
- Area: 276.5 acres (111.9 ha)
- Built: 1852
- Architect: Morris, Dr. John Gottlieb
- Architectural style: Colonial Revival, Late Victorian, Gothic Revival
- NRHP reference No.: 72000568
- Added to NRHP: November 9, 1972

Lutherville Historic District is a national historic district in Lutherville, Maryland, United States. It is an irregularly shaped urban entity founded in 1852 as a summer resort and suburb of Baltimore City. Single-family dwellings on large lots characterize the community and most of the structures predate World War I, although ranch-type and "colonial" houses have appeared in the past few decades.

It was added to the National Register of Historic Places in 1972.
