= Baltimore County Jail =

- U.S. National Register of Historic Places
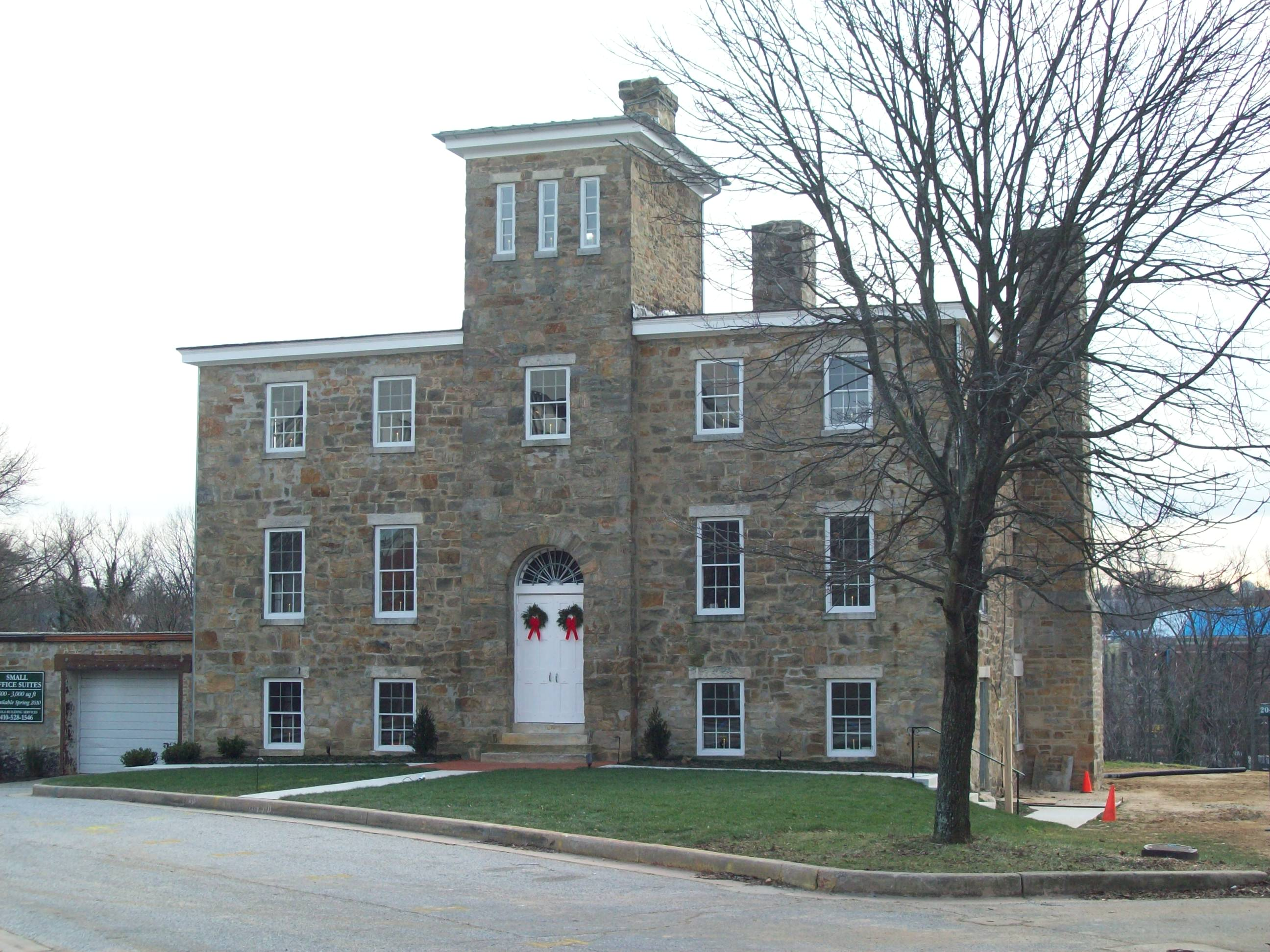
- Baltimore County Jail, December 2009

- Location within Maryland Location within the United States
- Location: 222 Courthouse Court, Towson, Maryland
- Coordinates: 39°23′51.7″N 76°36′28.5″W
- Built: 1855
- Architect: Dixon & Dixon
- Architectural style: Italianate
- NRHP reference No.: 09000644
- Added to NRHP: August 26, 2009

Baltimore County Jail is a historic jail located at Towson in Baltimore County, Maryland, United States. It was built in 1855 and is a two-story Italianate style stone building, measuring 52 feet wide and 62 feet deep. It consists of a five-bay-wide warden’s house with a central three story entry tower. In the rear is a cell block with three levels of jail cells and covered by a gable roof. The warden's house and tower features a low pyramidal hipped roof and 30-inch-thick (760 mm) walls. Attached to the warden's house is a stone garage built in 1940. It was used as a correctional facility until 2006.

It was listed on the National Register of Historic Places on August 26, 2009.
