= Lutherville, Maryland =

- Census-designated place
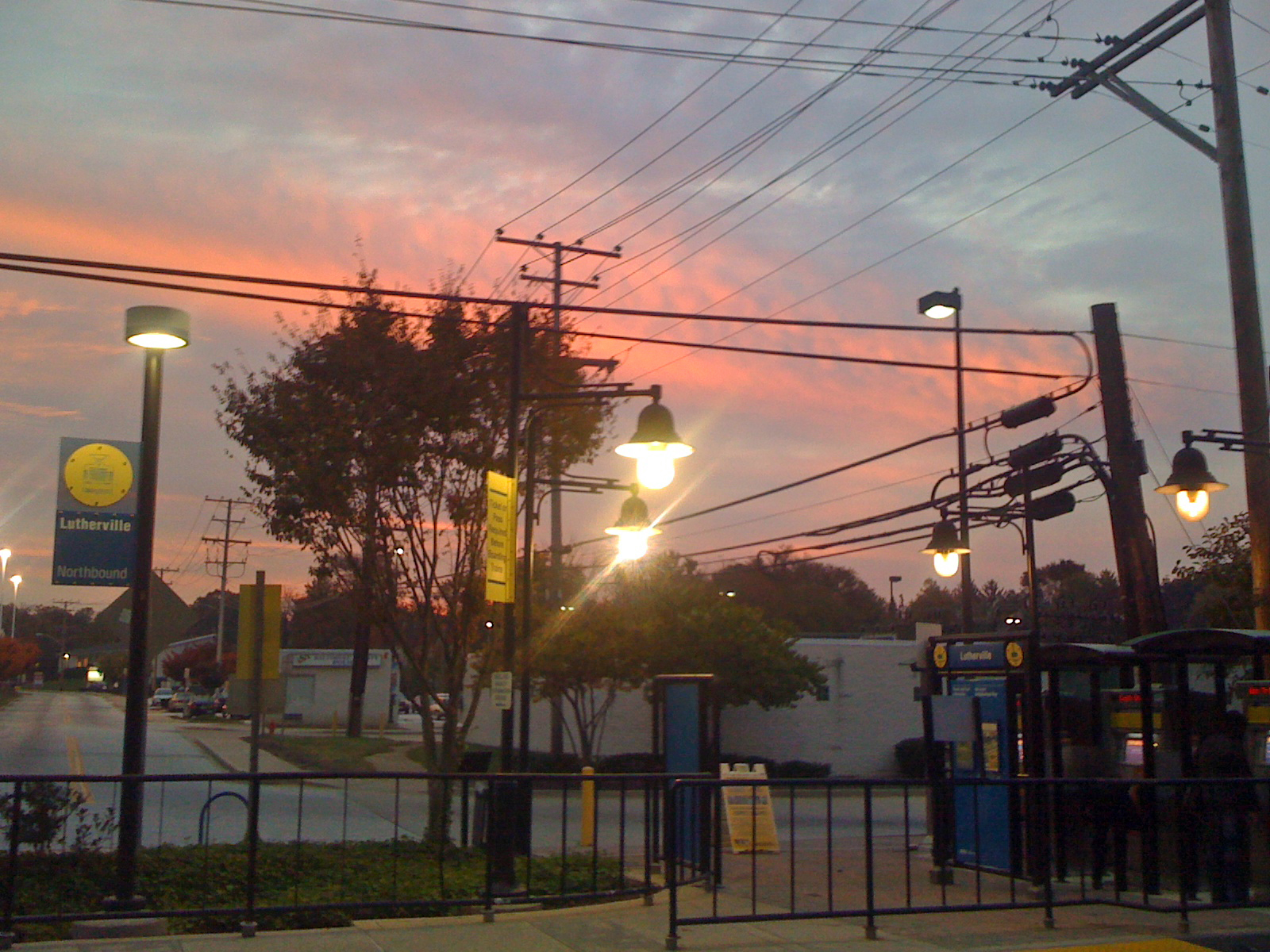
- Lutherville light rail station platform on Ridgely Road, in Lutherville, Maryland
- Nickname: Old Original
- Location of Lutherville, Maryland
- Coordinates: 39°25′26″N 76°37′3″W
- Country: United States
- State: Maryland
- County: Baltimore

Area
  - Total: 2.11 sq mi (5.47 km^{2})
  - Land: 2.11 sq mi (5.47 km^{2})
  - Water: 0 sq mi (0.00 km^{2})

Population (2020)
  - Total: 6,835
  - Density: 3,233.7/sq mi (1,248.54/km^{2})
- Time zone: UTC−5 (Eastern (EST))
  - Summer (DST): UTC−4 (EDT)
- ZIP codes: 21093-21094
- Area codes: 410, 443
- FIPS code: 24-48875

Lutherville is a census-designated place (CDP) in Baltimore County, Maryland, United States. As of the 2020 census it had a population of 6,835. Prior to 2010 the area was part of the Lutherville-Timonium CDP. Within its borders lies the Lutherville Historic District.

== Geography ==
Lutherville is located at 39°25′26″N 76°37′3″W (39.4240, −76.6177).

According to the United States Census Bureau, the CDP had a total area of 2.1 square miles (5.5 km^{2}), all land.

The town is located north of Baltimore along York Road (Maryland Route 45). It is bordered on the north by Timonium, on the west by Interstate 83, on the south by Towson, and on the east by the Hampton neighborhood. The boundary between Lutherville and Timonium is Ridgely Road.

Lutherville is located in the Piedmont region of the United States, and lies in the humid subtropical climate zone, with hot and humid summers leading into winters that are chilly but not extreme by American standards. The average annual snowfall is 25 inches (64 cm) and average annual precipitation is 42 inches (107 cm).

== Demographics ==
Historical population
Census	Pop.	Note	%±
1960	12,265		—
1970	24,055		96.1%
1980	17,854		−25.8%
1990	16,442		−7.9%
2000	15,814		−3.8%
2010	6,504		−58.9%
2020	6,835		5.1%
Separated from Lutherville-Timonium CDP in 2010 Census

Lutherville first appeared as a census designated place in the 2010 U.S. census after the Lutherville-Timonium CDP was split into the Lutherville CDP and the Timonium CDP.

=== 2020 census ===
As of the 2020 census, Lutherville had a population of 6,835. The median age was 44.8 years. 22.1% of residents were under the age of 18 and 21.2% were 65 years of age or older. For every 100 females, there were 96.5 males, and for every 100 females age 18 and over, there were 93.0 males age 18 and over.

100.0% of residents lived in urban areas, while 0.0% lived in rural areas.

There were 2,711 households, of which 31.1% had children under the age of 18 living in them. Of all households, 56.5% were married-couple households, 13.9% were households with a male householder and no spouse or partner present, and 24.9% were households with a female householder and no spouse or partner present. About 26.1% of all households were made up of individuals, and 15.9% had someone living alone who was 65 years of age or older.

There were 2,805 housing units, of which 3.4% were vacant. The homeowner vacancy rate was 0.4%, and the rental vacancy rate was 3.5%.

Lutherville CDP, Maryland – Racial and ethnic composition Note: the US Census treats Hispanic/Latino as an ethnic category. This table excludes Latinos from the racial categories and assigns them to a separate category. Hispanics/Latinos may be of any race.
Race / Ethnicity (NH = Non-Hispanic)	Pop 2010	Pop 2020	% 2010	% 2020
White alone (NH)	5,397	5,180	82.98%	75.79%
Black or African American alone (NH)	216	262	3.32%	3.83%
Native American or Alaska Native alone (NH)	9	10	0.14%	0.15%
Asian alone (NH)	528	678	8.12%	9.92%
Native Hawaiian or Pacific Islander alone (NH)	9	9	0.14%	0.13%
Other race alone (NH)	13	47	0.20%	0.69%
Mixed race or Multiracial (NH)	120	317	1.85%	4.64%
Hispanic or Latino (any race)	212	332	3.26%	4.86%
Total	6,504	6,835	100.00%	100.00%

=== 2010 census ===
As of the 2010 census, there were 6,504 people and 2,672 households in the CDP. The racial makeup (including Hispanics in the racial counts) of the CDP is 85.0% White, 3.4% African American, 0.2% Native American, 8.2% Asian, 0.2% Native Hawaiian and Pacific Islander, and 3.3% Hispanic or Latino.

Out of the 2,672 households recorded in the 2010 census, 28.3% had children under the age of 18 living with them.

== Transportation ==
=== Roads ===
Major roads in Lutherville include:

- Dulaney Valley Road (MD-146), forming part of Lutherville's eastern boundary with Hampton
- Ridgely Road, forming Lutherville's northern boundary with Timonium
- Seminary Avenue (MD-131)
- York Road (MD-45)

=== Public transportation ===
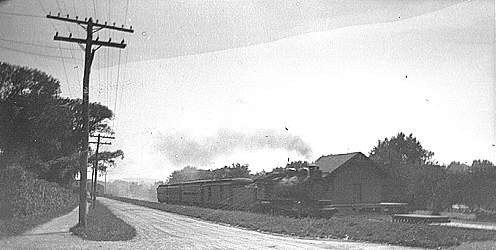
Northern Central Railway train at Lutherville during World War I (1917–1918)

The Maryland Transit Administration's light rail line serves the community with the Lutherville Light Rail Stop. In addition, bus routes 8 and 9 provide regular service along the York Road corridor, meeting at the Lutherville Light Rail Stop. There is also a limited amount of bus service on Bus Route 12 along Dulaney Valley Road to Stella Maris Hospice. In addition, the Baltimore CityLink Red line serves the Lutherville Light Rail station.

The MTA light rail line uses the right-of-way of the old Northern Central Railway (later, part of the extensive Pennsylvania Railroad system). During the Civil War, President Abraham Lincoln travelled through Lutherville on this railroad en route to Gettysburg, Pennsylvania, to deliver the Gettysburg Address on November 19, 1863. Less than two years later, on April 21, 1865, Lincoln's funeral train also passed through Lutherville on its way from Washington, D.C. to his final resting place at Springfield, Illinois. The Pennsylvania Railroad (PRR) operated long-distance passenger trains from Baltimore over the line to Chicago, St. Louis, and Buffalo as late as the 1960s. The former PRR Lutherville freight and passenger station on Railroad Avenue is now a private residence.

== History ==
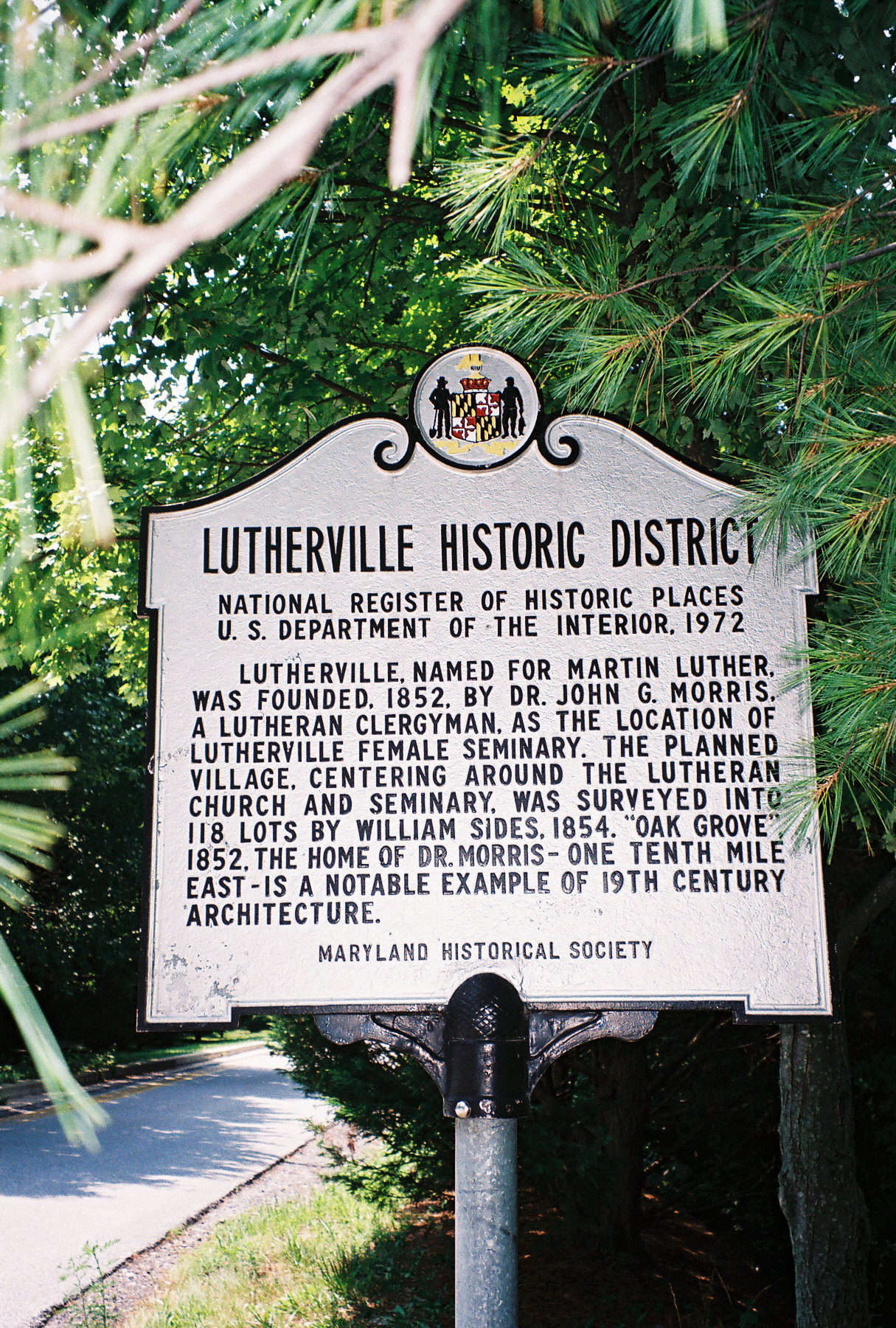
Lutherville historic marker

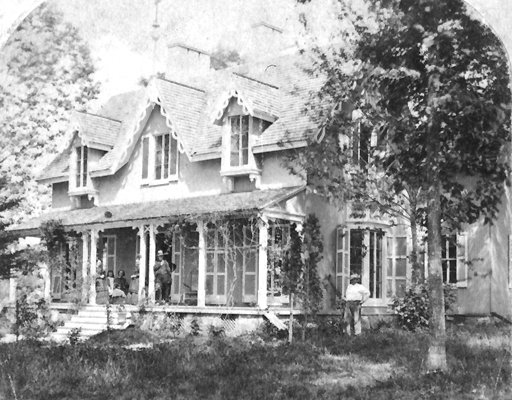
Oak Grove, the home of Lutherville founder John Morris, in 1872

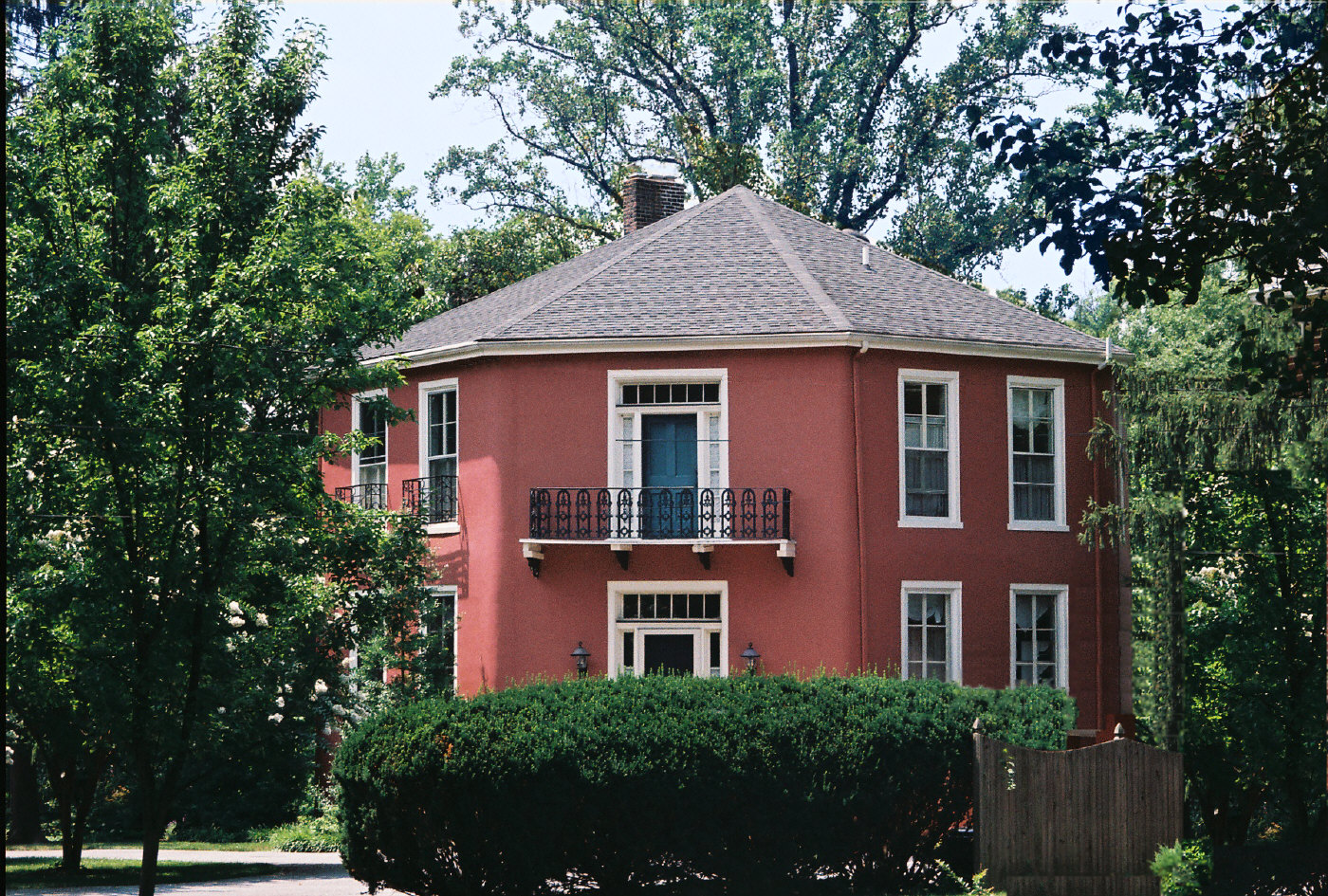
Octagon House, built in 1855

The oldest section of Lutherville dates back to 1852, when it was founded by two Lutheran ministers as a planned community, anchored by a Lutheran seminary and church. The land was originally part of the vast Hampton Estate of Charles Ridgely, from whom it was purchased in 1851.

The two ministers, Benjamin Kurtz and John Gottlieb Morris, named the community after the 16th-century German reformer Martin Luther. The Lutherville Female Seminary, as it was initially called when chartered in 1853, was built near the tracks of the Baltimore & Susquehanna Railroad, a forerunner of the Northern Central Railway. In 1895, the institution was renamed the Maryland College for Women. Following a devastating fire in 1911, the college was rebuilt and continued in operation until 1952. Its campus is now an adult congregate living facility, College Manor.

The Lutherville Historic District was added to the National Register of Historic Places in 1972. Notable structures, in addition to the old college building and the many Victorian homes, include:

- St. Paul's Lutheran Church, started in 1856 by John Morris. The present stone sanctuary was built in 1898.
- St. John's Methodist Church, built in 1869.
- Church of the Holy Comforter, an Episcopal church built in 1888.
- Oak Grove, the house of Lutherville founder John Morris, built in 1852 on Morris Avenue. Filmmaker John Waters lived in the Oak Grove house with his family as a teenager in the 1960s. Some of Waters' earliest filmmaking efforts took place at the house.
- Octagon house on Kurtz Avenue, built of concrete in 1855 by another Lutheran minister who also served as the town's postmaster.

== Notable people ==
- All Time Low, pop punk band
- Raymond Berry, Baltimore Colts Hall of Famer
- Ryan Boyle, professional lacrosse player
- Bosley Crowther, film critic
- Cinder Road, rock band
- Divine, actor
- Samuel T. Durrance, astronaut/physicist
- Conor Gill, professional lacrosse player
- Mark Hamilton, Major League Baseball player
- Billy Hunter, former Major League Baseball shortstop and manager
- Phil Karn, internet engineer
- Santa Ono, medical scientist, 28th President, University of Cincinnati; 15th President, University of British Columbia
- Rafael Palmeiro, former Major League Baseball first baseman
- Jim Palmer, former Baltimore Orioles pitcher and Hall of Famer
- Kevin Plank, entrepreneur (UnderArmour), resident
- Brooks Robinson, former Baltimore Orioles third baseman and Hall of Famer
- Gavin Sheets, MLB first baseman
- Mike Singletary, member of the Pro Football Hall of Fame, middle linebacker for the Chicago Bears, member of the 1985 Chicago Bears team that won Super Bowl XX, and former head coach of the San Francisco 49ers
- J. Frederick C. Talbott, U.S. congressman 1878–1918
- Bob Turley, former Major League Baseball pitcher
- Jerry Turner, television news anchorman (1929–1987)
- Johnny Unitas, former Baltimore Colt and Hall of Famer
- John Waters, filmmaker
- Derek Waters, actor & comedian
- Spencer Horwitz, MLB first baseman

== Education ==
Public schools

- Dulaney High School (in Timonium)
- Hampton Elementary School
- Lutherville Laboratory Elementary School
- Ridgely Middle School
- Pinewood Elementary School

A portion of Lutherville's high school-age students attend nearby Towson High School.

== Gallery ==
Images of Lutherville

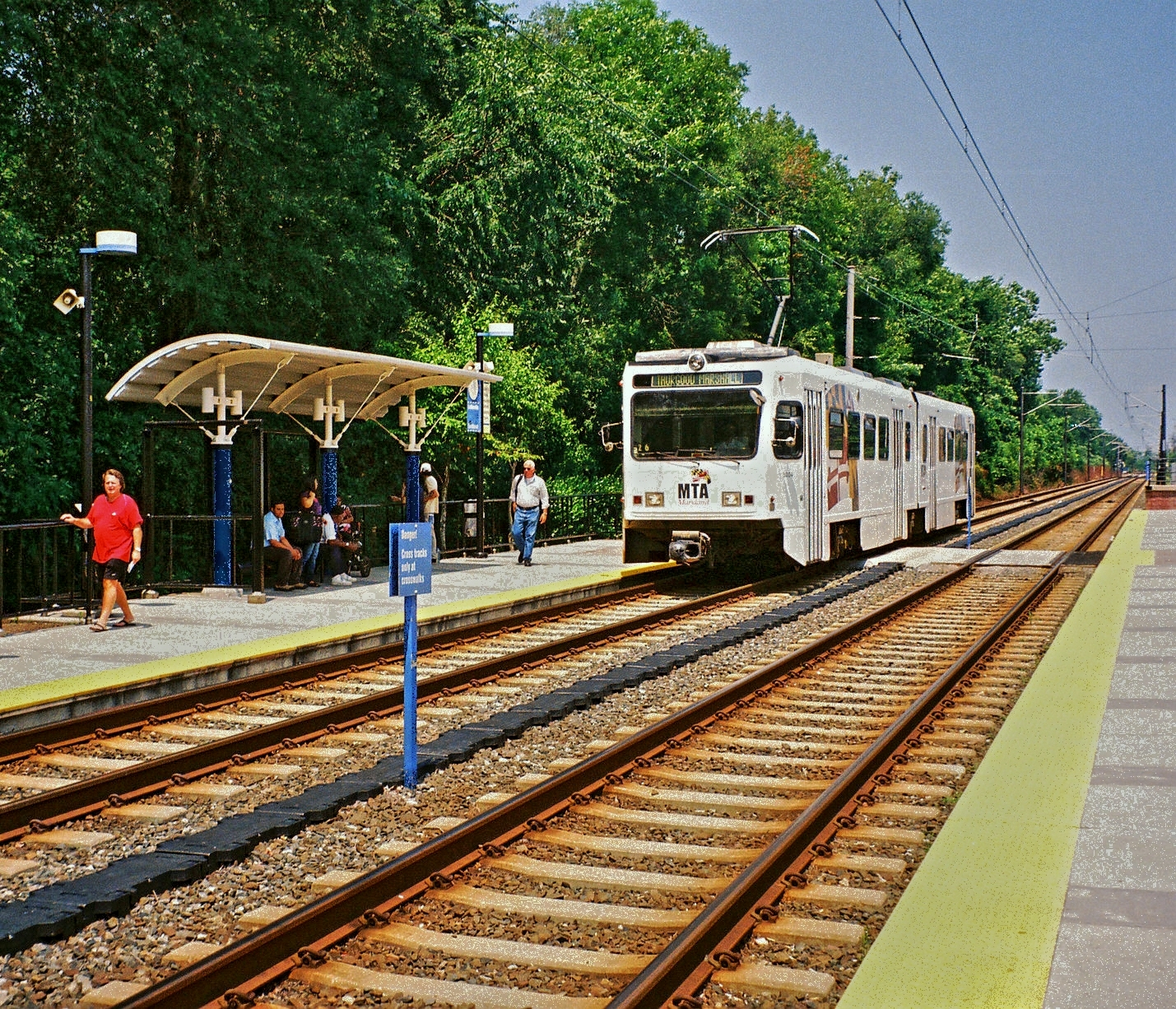
Lutherville Light Rail station

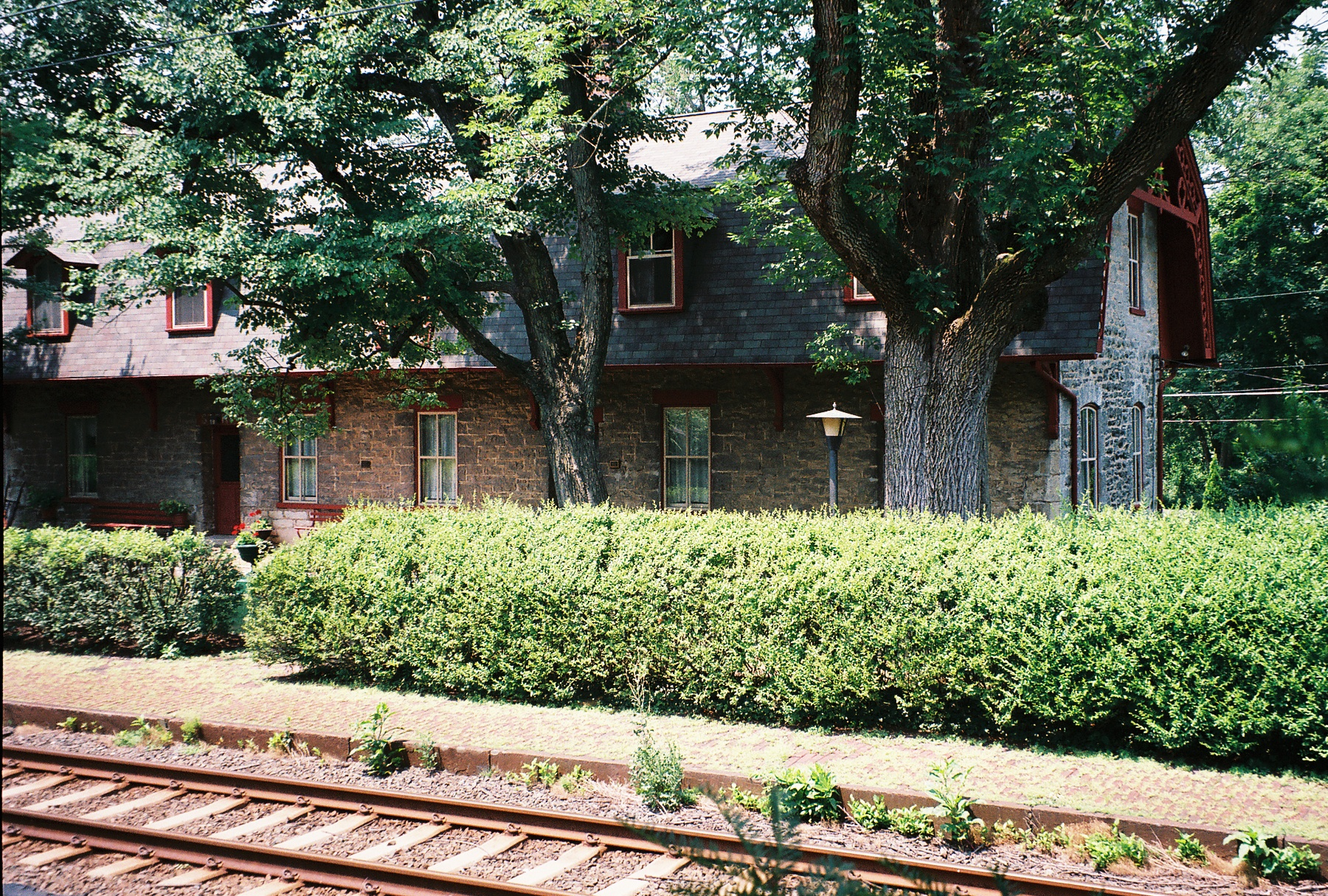
Former Pennsylvania Railroad station

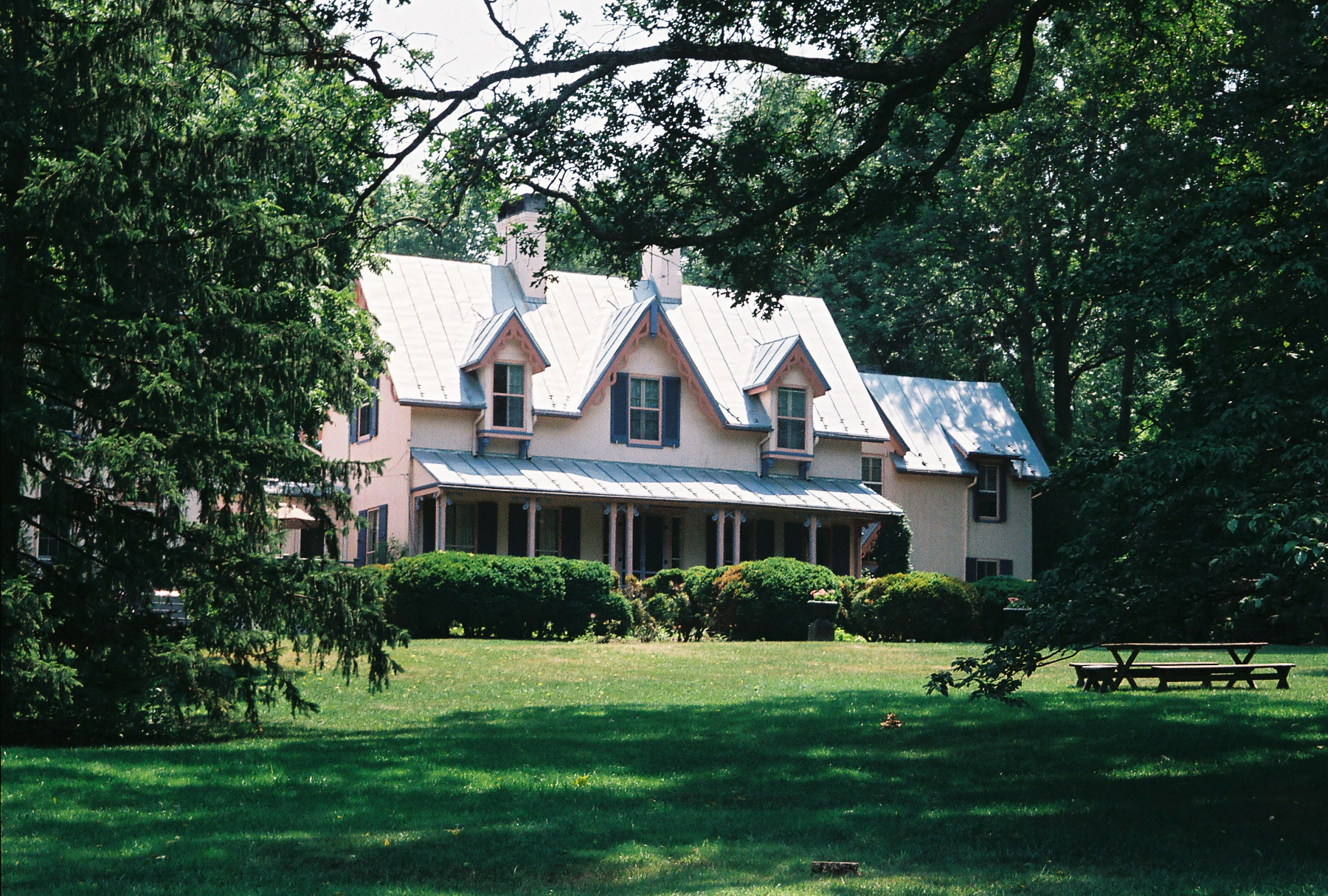
Oak Grove in 2009

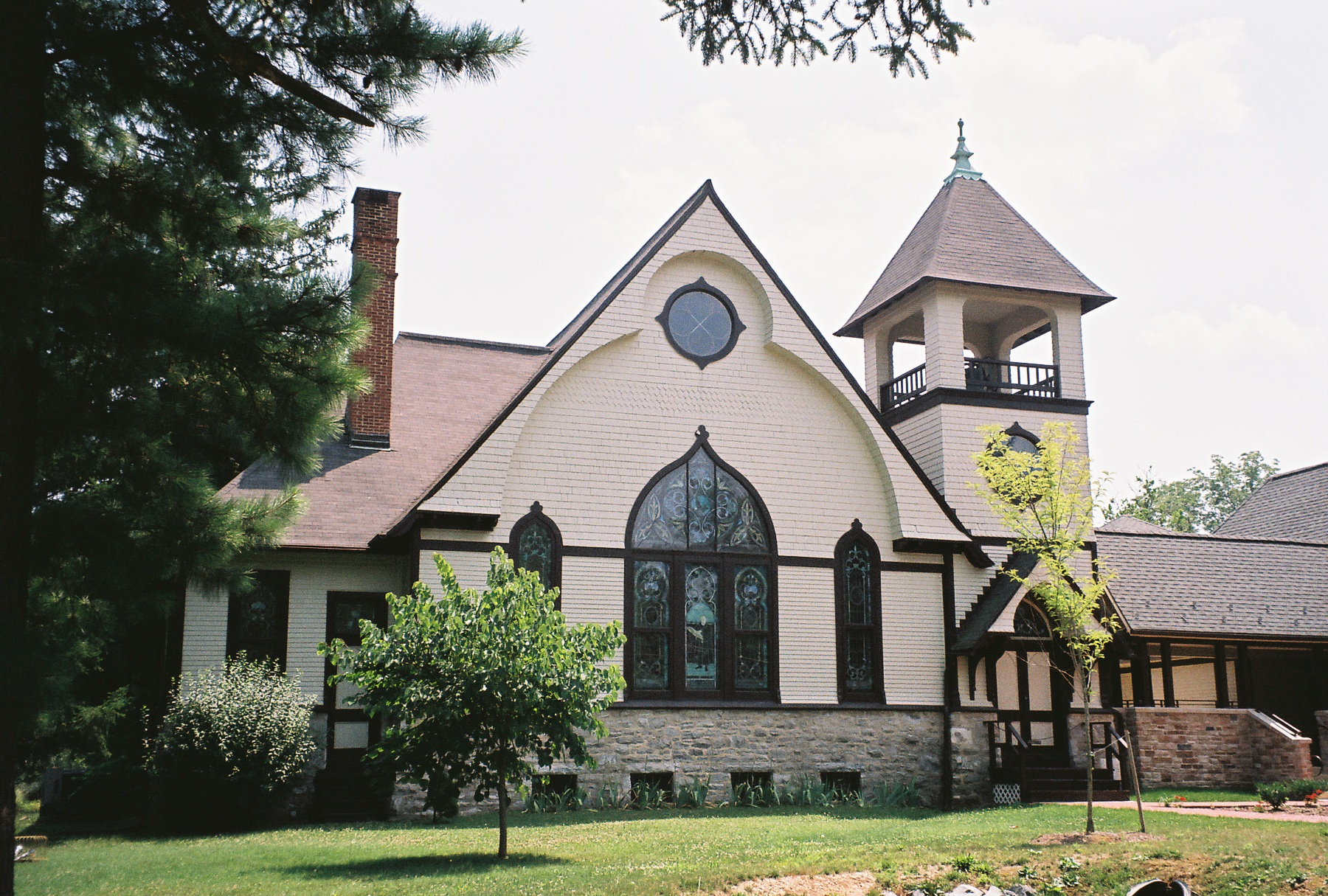
St. Paul's Lutheran Church

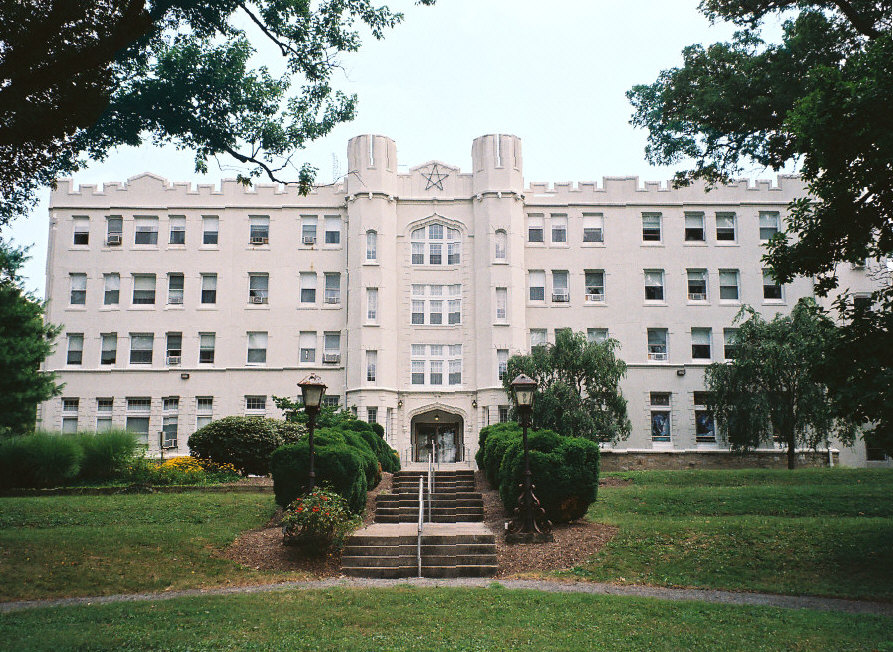
Former Maryland College for Women
