= Philip Reese Uhler =

American entomologist and librarian (1835–1913)

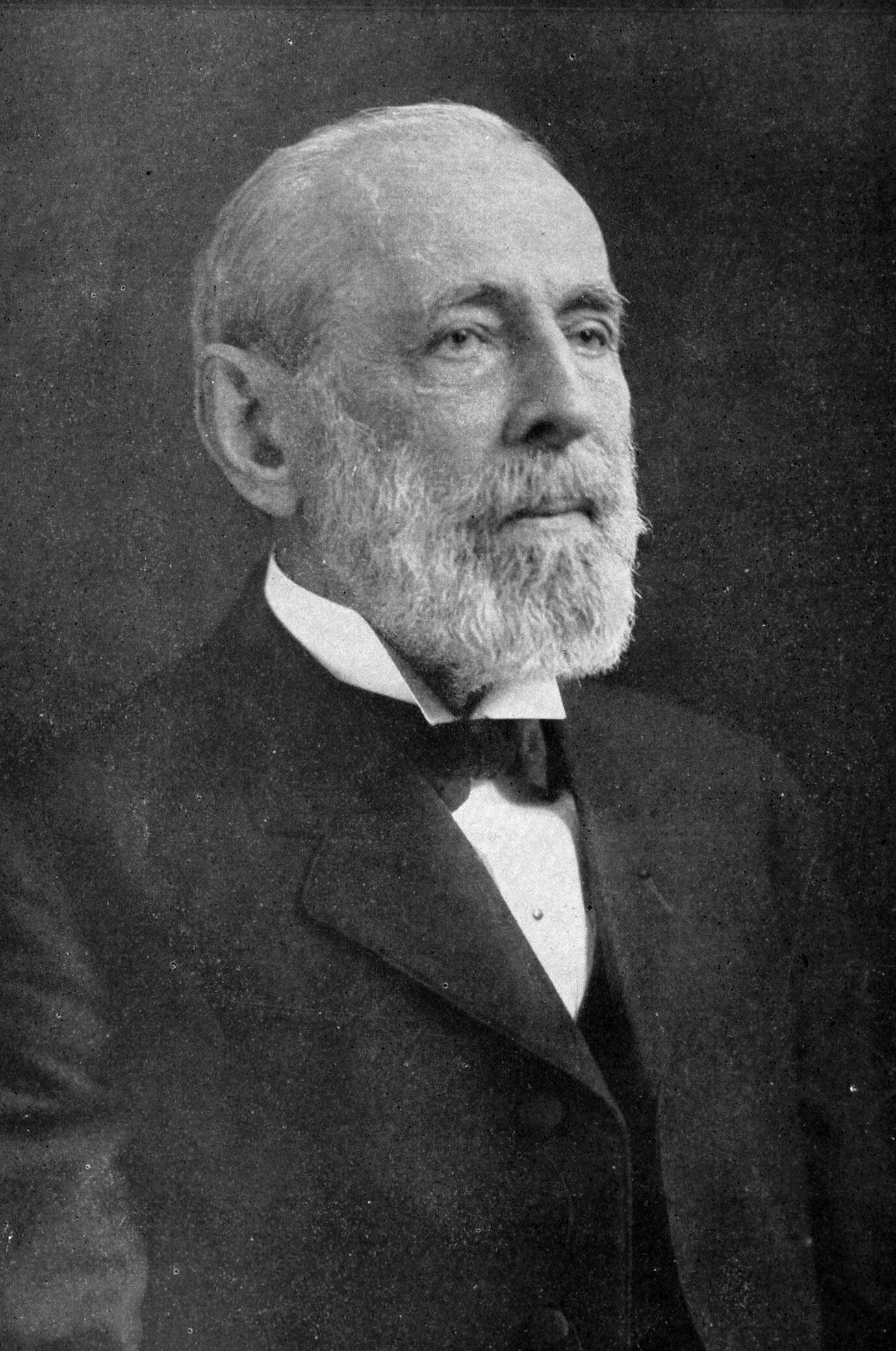
Philip Reese Uhler

Philip Reese Uhler (June 3, 1835 – October 21, 1913) was an American librarian and entomologist who specialized in Hemiptera, an insect order commonly known as true bugs. He was considered America's foremost expert on this group and was widely sought out for identification of species in this order.

== Biography ==
Uhler was born in Baltimore, Maryland, the son of George Washington Uhler and Anna Reese Uhler. His father was a prosperous merchant and his great-grandfather, Erasmus Uhler, emigrated to America and served in the Revolutionary War. Uhler's private schooling provided a strong background in Latin and German. He attended Latin School in Baltimore and then Baltimore College.

Uhler's youthful interest in entomology started when he began collecting insects at the family farm near Reisterstown. His pursuit was encouraged by a family friend, John Gottlieb Morris, an amateur naturalist and the first librarian for the Peabody Institute. Although his father set him up in business, Uhler preferred to spend his time studying geology, botany, and entomology. One of his earliest papers was the Descriptions of a Few Species of Coleoptera Supposed to be New, published in 1856. In 1861 he published his first paper on the insect order, Hemiptera (true bugs), and most of his subsequent entomological papers focused almost entirely on this group. In 1861 he translated from Latin Hermann A. Hagen's Synopsis of Neuroptera of North America, issued by the Smithsonian Institution.

In 1862 Uhler was appointed assistant librarian at the Peabody, working under Morris. A short time later he began his studies at Harvard University as a student of Louis Agassiz. In 1864 Agassiz appointed Uhler to serve as both librarian at the Museum of Comparative Zoology and curator of the museum's substantial insect collections. At the same time Uhler taught entomology to Harvard undergraduates and gave a series of lectures at the museum. He also attended the Lawrence Scientific School at Harvard and studied with some of the university's most notable scientists and naturalists including Asa Gray, Jeffries Wyman, Agassiz and Nathaniel Shaler.

Uhler returned to Baltimore in 1867, resuming his position as assistant librarian at the Peabody Institute and in 1870 he was appointed librarian, a position he held for the rest of his life. He was also actively involved in the formation of Johns Hopkins University and in 1876 became one of the first associate professors at the new research university.

In addition to his work at the Peabody and Johns Hopkins, Uhler found time to continue his studies of the Hemiptera. He was the foremost American expert on this insect order and corresponded extensively with other entomologists. He described many of the Hemiptera that were gathered by exploring expeditions in the American West and in 1877 the US Geological Survey published his List of Hemiptera of the Region West of the Mississippi River, Including Those Collected by the Hayden Explorations of 1877. Over the course of his career Uhler identified about 600 new species of insects. He also wrote a few notable papers on the geology of the Cretaceous and introduced improved methods of cataloging books at the Peabody. Working with Nathaniel H. Morison, Uhler published a comprehensive five-volume catalog of the Peabody library holdings (1883-1892).

Uhler was involved in numerous scientific organizations. He was a fellow of the American Association for the Advancement of Science, founder and president of the Maryland Academy of Science, and member of the American Entomological Society, Academy of Natural Sciences of Philadelphia, Entomological Society of Washington, and the Royal Society of the Arts (London).

Uhler published his last paper, Recognition of two North American species of Cicada, in 1905. By then his vision was severely impaired with glaucoma and he was forced to curtail his studies. He died on October 21, 1913.

== Works ==
During his career, Uhler published about fifty papers and books on entomology, geology, and library science. Some of his writings include:

- (1856) Descriptions of a Few Species of Coleoptera Supposed to be New
- (1861) Hemiptera of the North Pacific exploring expedition under Com’rs Rodgers and Ringgold
- (1872) Notices of the Hemiptera of the western territories of the United States, chiefly from the surveys of Dr. F. V. Hayden
- (1876) List of Hemiptera of the region west of the Mississippi River, including those collected during the Hayden Explorations of 1873
- (1888) Observations on the Eocene Tertiary and its Cretaceous associates in the State of Maryland
- (1894) Observations upon the heteropterous Hemiptera of Lower California, with descriptions of new species
- (1901) Some new genera and species of North American Hemiptera
- (1905) Recognition of two North American species of Cicada

Also:

- Kirkland, A.H. 1897. Notes on Predaceous Heteroptera, With Prof. Uhler's Description of Two Species. The Canadian Entomologist 29: 115–118. doi:10.4039/Ent29115-5
