= Baltimore County, Maryland =

County in Maryland, United States

- County
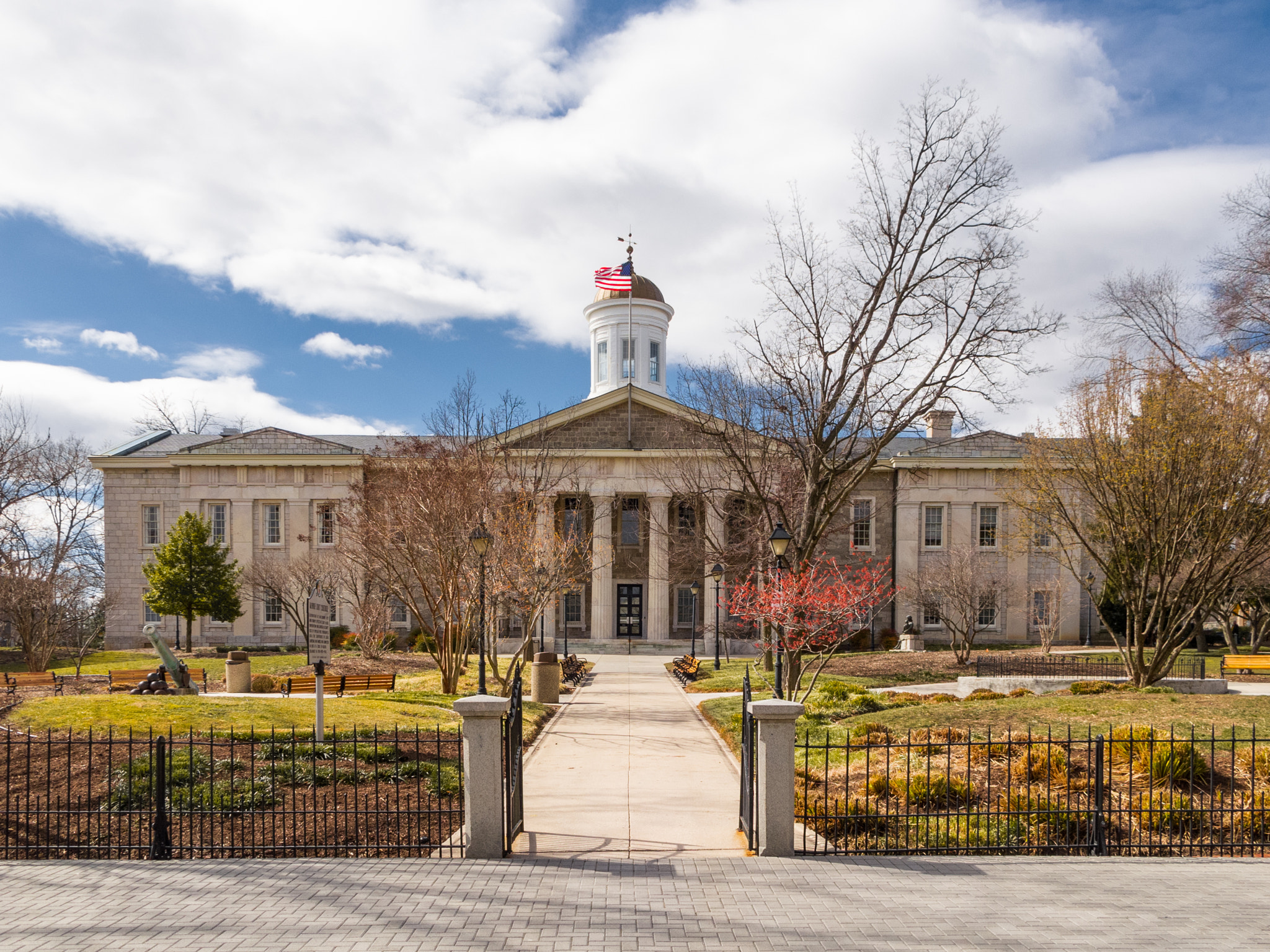
- The Baltimore County Courthouse

- Flag Seal
- Nicknames: "BalCo", "B-More County", "The County"
- Location within the U.S. state of Maryland
- Coordinates: 39°24′N 76°36′W
- Country: United States
- State: Maryland
- Founded: June 30, 1659
- Named for: Cecil Calvert, 2nd Baron Baltimore
- Seat: Towson
- Largest community: Dundalk

Government
  - Executive: Kathy Klausmeier

Area
  - Total: 682 sq mi (1,770 km^{2})
  - Land: 598 sq mi (1,550 km^{2})
  - Water: 83 sq mi (210 km^{2}) 12%

Population (2020)
  - Total: 854,535
  - Estimate (2025): 847,650 ▼
  - Density: 1,430/sq mi (552/km^{2})
- Time zone: UTC−5 (Eastern)
  - Summer (DST): UTC−4 (EDT)
- Congressional districts: 1st, 2nd, 7th
- Website: baltimorecountymd.gov

Baltimore County is the third-most populous county in the U.S. state of Maryland. The county is part of the Central Maryland region of the state. Baltimore County partly surrounds but does not include the independent city of Baltimore. It is part of the Northeast megalopolis, which stretches from Northern Virginia in the south to Boston in the north and includes major American population centers, including New York City and Philadelphia. Major economic sectors in the county include education, government, and health care. As of the 2020 census, the population was 854,535. The county is home to several universities, including Goucher College, Stevenson University, Towson University, and University of Maryland, Baltimore County.

== History ==
=== 17th century ===
The name "Baltimore" derives from Cecil Calvert, 2nd Baron Baltimore (1605–1675), proprietor of the colonial-era Province of Maryland, and the town of Baltimore in County Cork, Ireland. The earliest known documentary record of the county is dated January 12, 1659, when a writ was issued on behalf of the General Assembly of Maryland to its sheriff.

The county was founded in 1659, and is now one of 23 counties in the state. The initial Baltimore County was larger geographically than it is currently, including most of northeastern Maryland, which was then the northwestern frontier of the Province and included the present-day jurisdictions of Baltimore City, Cecil and Harford Counties, and parts of Carroll, Anne Arundel, Frederick, Howard, and Kent Counties.

In 1674, a proclamation of the Proprietor established the then-extensive boundary lines for old Baltimore County. Over the next century, various segments of the old county were sliced off as population and settlements increased in fringe regions. A portion of northeastern Baltimore County, as well as a portion of northwestern Kent County, was split off to create Cecil County. In 1748, a portion of western Baltimore County, as well as a portion of Prince George's County to the south, were split off to create Frederick County. In 1773, Harford County to the east was split off, and in 1837 another part of western Baltimore County was combined with a part of eastern Frederick County to create Carroll County. After the adjustment of Baltimore County's southern boundary with Anne Arundel County, stated to be the upper Middle and Western Branches of the Patapsco River in 1727, a portion of the county's northwestern area was designated in 1838 as the "Western District" or "Howard District" of Arundel and in 1851 was officially separated to form Howard County.

Prior to 1674, Baltimore County court sessions were held in private residences, according to sketchy documentary evidence. In 1674, the General Assembly passed "An Act for erecting a Court-house and Prison in each County within this Province". The site of the courthouse, jail and county seat for Baltimore County was evidently "Old Baltimore" near the Bush River on land that in 1773 became part of Harford County.

The exact location of Old Baltimore is Chilbury Point on the north side of the Bush River owned by the Garrison of the present-day Aberdeen Proving Ground (APG), a U.S. Army weapons testing facility. It is a popular spot of local boaters. APG's Cultural Resource Management Program attempted to find Old Baltimore, contracting with R. Christopher Goodwin & Associates (Goodwin). Goodwin first performed historical and archival work and coordinated with existing landscape features to locate the site of Old Baltimore. APG's Explosive Ordnance Disposal of Army personnel defused any unexploded ordnance. In 1997–1998. Goodwin dug 420 test pits, uncovering artifacts including a King Charles II farthing coin, and French and English gun flints. An unearthed brick foundation proved to be the remains of the tavern owned by colonist James Phillips. Another prominent landholder in Old Baltimore was William Osbourne, who operated the ferry across the Bush River.

In 1683, the Maryland General Assembly passed "An Act for Advancement of Trade" to "establish towns, ports, and places of trade, within the province." One of the towns established by the act was "on Bush River, on Town Land, near the Court-House". The courthouse on the Bush River referenced in the 1683 Act was in all likelihood the one created by the 1674 Act. "Old Baltimore" was in existence as early as 1674, but no documents describe what may have preceded it.

By 1695, the "Old Baltimore" courthouse had evidently been abandoned. County justices put the site up for sale. Apparently a new courthouse at "Simm's Choice" on the Baltimore County side of Little Gunpowder Falls had been under construction since 1692.

=== 18th century ===
In 1700, builder Michael Judd sold the courthouse to the county justices. This change of location, away from the Bush River area, reflects the growing economic and political importance of the Gunpowder region. During the next decade, the county seat moved to Joppa.

By 1724, the legislative assembly authorized Thomas Tolley, Capt. John Taylor, Daniel Scott, Lancelot Todd, and John Stokes purchased 20 acres from "Taylor's Choice," a tract named after John Taylor. The assembly's ordinance directed that the land be divided into 40 lots with streets and alleys to accompany the courthouse and jail erected previously. By 1750, about 50 houses (including a few large two-story brick structures), a church (St. John's Anglican Parish), a courthouse, three stone warehouses, inns, taverns, stores, a public wharf and a "gallows-tree" with an "Amen Corner" with pillories and whipping posts (now located northeast of the City of Baltimore near present-day suburban "Joppatowne" off Harford Road) existed.

A new port and wharfing site, Elkridge Landing, on the upper Patapsco River's Western Branch, became prosperous in the 18th century. It was established on the "falls" of the river, below the rapids and rocks, where the river was deep enough for loaded sailing merchantmen. The landing was a designated "port of entry" and was the terminus of several "rolling roads" on which horse or oxen-drawn hogsheads (huge barrels) packed with tobacco were wheeled down to the Landing/port to be loaded on ships sailing for London and Europe. Gradually the site silted-up from soil erosion and poor farming cultivation on the upper Patapsco, and the maritime economy of the Landing faded. In the 19th century, it became an important stop on the Baltimore and Ohio Railroad and the main north-south East Coast highway for wagons and carriages. Still, later it was on Washington Boulevard (designated U.S. Route 1) by 1926.

With a bit of financial pressure, and after paying for the cost of a new courthouse (300 pounds sterling), dominant business, commercial and political residents of the Town of Baltimore were able to have the Maryland General Assembly relocate the county seat to their growing port town. In 1768, following receipt of petitions for and against the relocation, the General Assembly passed an Act that moved the county seat from Joppa to Baltimore. The first courthouse was constructed in 1768 at a new Courthouse Square at present-day North Calvert Street, between East Lexington and East Fayette Streets.

=== 19th century ===
The city of Baltimore, Jonestown, and Fells Point were incorporated as the City of Baltimore in 1796–1797. The city remained a part of surrounding Baltimore County and continued to serve as its county seat from 1768 to 1851.

The site of the courthouse is now "Battle Monument Square", constructed 1815–1822 to commemorate the city and county defense in the War of 1812, including the bombardment of Fort McHenry by the British Royal Navy fleet in the Patapsco River, the two-day stand-off in fortifications dug east of the city on Loudenschlager's Hill (now "Hampstead Hill" in today's Patterson Park) and the earlier Battle of North Point in "Godly Woods" on the "Patapsco Neck" peninsula in the southeastern portion of the county, during September 12–14, 1814. These events have been commemorated ever since by Defenders Day, an annual city, county, and state official holiday on September 12.

A second city-county courthouse constructed in 1805–1809 was moved to the western side of the Square at North Calvert and East Lexington. A third courthouse including the lower magistrates, commissioners, district and circuit courts, orphans (inheritances/wills) court, small claims court and the old Supreme Bench of Baltimore City was constructed on the entire western block of North Calvert, East Lexington, East Fayette and Saint Paul Streets from 1896 to 1900.

In 1816, the City of Baltimore annexed from Baltimore County several parcels of land known as the "Precincts" on its west, north, east and southwest sides. The County separated from the city (which it surrounds on the east, north, and west) on July 4, 1851, as a result of the adoption of the 1851 second state constitution. Baltimore became one of the few "independent cities" in the United States, putting it on the same level with the state's other 23 counties and granting limited "home rule" powers outside the authority of the Maryland General Assembly.

Towsontown was voted in a referendum by the voting citizens as the new "county seat" on February 13, 1854. The City of Baltimore continued annexing land from the county, extending its western and northern boundaries in 1888. The factory and business owners in the eastern industrial communities of Canton and Highlandtown resisted and opposed annexation, but were annexed 30 years later. The last major annexation took place in 1918–1919, which again took territory from the county on all three sides (west, north, and east) and to the south for the first time from Anne Arundel County, along the south shores of the Patapsco River.

=== 20th century ===
A new Baltimore County Courthouse was authorized to be built facing Washington Avenue, between Chesapeake and Pennsylvania Avenues to replace the previous courthouse and governmental offices then centered for near 85 years in the city, which had been the official "county seat" since just before the American Revolution. Later surrounded by manicured flower gardens, shrubs and curved walkways, the historical landmark is built of local limestone and marble. It was completed and dedicated in 1855. Wings and annexes were added in 1910, 1923 and 1958. By the 1970s, the county's legal system and governmental offices had grown so much that a separate modernistic "County Courts Building" was erected to the west behind the old Courthouse with its annexes, separated by a paved plaza which is used for employee/visitors relaxations and official ceremonies.

A constitutional amendment to the 1867 Maryland Constitution was approved by referendum in 1948, prohibiting any future annexations without approval from residents in affected territories.

Extensive city-county hostilities came during the Civil Rights Movement, and by the 1980s the county's older inner suburbs faced increasing urban social ills. An atmosphere of cooperation emerged with the drawing of cross-border state assembly districts, organizing of regional government agencies, and increasing state assumption of powers.

The county has a number of properties and sites of local, state and national historical interest on the National Register of Historic Places which is maintained by the National Park Service of the U.S. Department of the Interior by the "Historic Sites Act" of August 1935.

In 1985, the Clarence M. Mitchell Jr. City Circuit Courthouse, a Baltimore City Circuit Courthouse, was named in honor of Baltimorean and Civil Rights Movement leader Clarence M. Mitchell Jr..

== Politics and government ==
Baltimore County has had a charter government since 1956. The government consists of a County Executive and a seven-member County Council. The County Executive and Council members are elected in years of gubernatorial elections. The County Executive may serve a maximum of two consecutive terms.

Without incorporated cities or towns, the county government provides all local services to its residents, many of which are normally associated with city-type governmental agencies.

In 1956, the County adopted an "executive-council" system of government with "at large" representatives, replacing its traditional system of an elected Board of County Commissioners. Since then it has had eleven county executives and one "acting" executive, of which ten were Democrats and two were Republicans. The former Vice President of the United States, Spiro T. Agnew, served as the third executive from 1962 to 1966 and subsequently was elected Governor of Maryland, serving from 1967 to 1969. He was later accused of corruption and bribery while serving as County executive and continuing to accept bribes as the state's governor and as U.S. vice president. He pleaded "no contest" to unprecedented Federal criminal charges. He was forced to resign the Vice Presidency in 1973.

=== State's attorney ===
The Baltimore County State's Attorney is responsible for prosecuting the felony, misdemeanor, and juvenile cases that occur in the county. As of 2017, the State's Attorney was Scott Shellenberger (Democrat). He followed Sandra A. O'Connor, a Republican who served eight terms before retiring in 2006.

=== Law enforcement ===
The Baltimore County Police Department is responsible for police services.

Established in the mid-17th century, the Sheriff of Baltimore County was at first filled by county justices from 1662 to 1676. After 1676, the Court submitted three names from which the colonial governor chose a sheriff. Although terms of office initially varied, by 1692, a uniform two-year term was imposed. In 1699 a three-year term with separate commissions was adopted. The sheriff acted as the chief local representative of the proprietary government. His duties included the collection of all public taxes and after 1692, the collection of the yearly poll tax of forty pounds of tobacco for the support of the Anglican (Church of England) clergy and parishes. A sheriff received a percentage of collected monies, generally about five percent. He also received a yearly salary for duties such as reporting to the governor on affairs within the county, taking/estimating the census periodically, conveying official laws and proprietary requests to the county courts and selecting juries for court sessions. Along with enforcing all provincial laws, he posted new laws in public places. While his primary duty was to serve the Proprietor, the sheriff was aware of problems faced by poor planters and tradesmen. With taxes, yearly quit-rents and other costly expenditures, many of the poorer settlers were unable to pay their obligations when due. The sheriff often extended credit to these planters and paid their immediate obligations out of his own pocket. This lessened the impact of taxes for the poor, who repaid the sheriff after their harvests were brought in.

The modern Baltimore County Sheriff's Department is responsible for security of the two major County Circuit Courts buildings and various courtrooms elsewhere as well as process and warrant service. Sheriff's Deputies are sworn police officers and share the same powers of the more recently organized County Police Department. As of 2019, the Baltimore County Sheriff is a Democrat, R. J. Fisher.

The Maryland State Police is headquartered at 1201 Reisterstown Road in the Pikesville CDP.

The Federal Bureau of Investigation (FBI) Baltimore field office is located in Milford Mill.

=== Fire Department ===
The Baltimore County Fire Department (B.Co.F.D.) provides fire protection, emergency medical services and emergency rescue services to the county and surrounding areas, including Baltimore City, through mutual-aid pacts with those jurisdictions. The department consists of both paid and volunteer companies that provide services to overlapping territories. Twenty-five career (paid) stations and 28 volunteer stations operate there. More than 1,000 paid personnel and more than 2,000 volunteers serve in the department. The department conducts annual fire inspections on commercial properties, fire investigation and fire prevention education activities as well as water and tactical rescue.

Sworn in as fire chief on July 1, 2019, Joanne R. Rund is the first female chief to be permanently appointed to the position.

=== County executives ===
The Baltimore County Executive oversees the executive branch of the County government, which is charged with implementing County law and overseeing the government operations.

List of County Executives

- 1956–1958, Michael J. Birmingham (D)
- 1958–1962, Christian H. Kahl (D)
- 1962–1966, Spiro T. Agnew (R)
- 1966–1974, Dale Anderson (D)
- 1974–1974, Frederick L. Dewberry (D) (acting)
- 1974–1978, Theodore G. Venetoulis (D)
- 1978–1986, Donald P. Hutchinson (D)
- 1986–1990, Dennis F. Rasmussen (D)
- 1990–1994, Roger B. Hayden (R)
- 1994–2002, C. A. Dutch Ruppersberger III (D)
- 2002–2010, James T. Smith Jr. (D)
- 2010–2018, Kevin B. Kamenetz (D)
- 2018–2018, Donald I. Mohler III (D)
- 2018–2025, John A. Olszewski Jr. (D)
- 2025–2025, D'Andrea Walker (acting)
- 2025–present, Katherine A. Klausmeier (D)

Notes: Anderson resigned after being convicted of several crimes and sentenced to prison. Kamenetz died on May 10, 2018. County Administrative Officer Frederick J. Homan was acting county executive until the county council named Mohler to serve the remainder of Kamenetz's term.

=== County council ===
The County Council adopts ordinances and resolutions and holds the county's legislative powers.

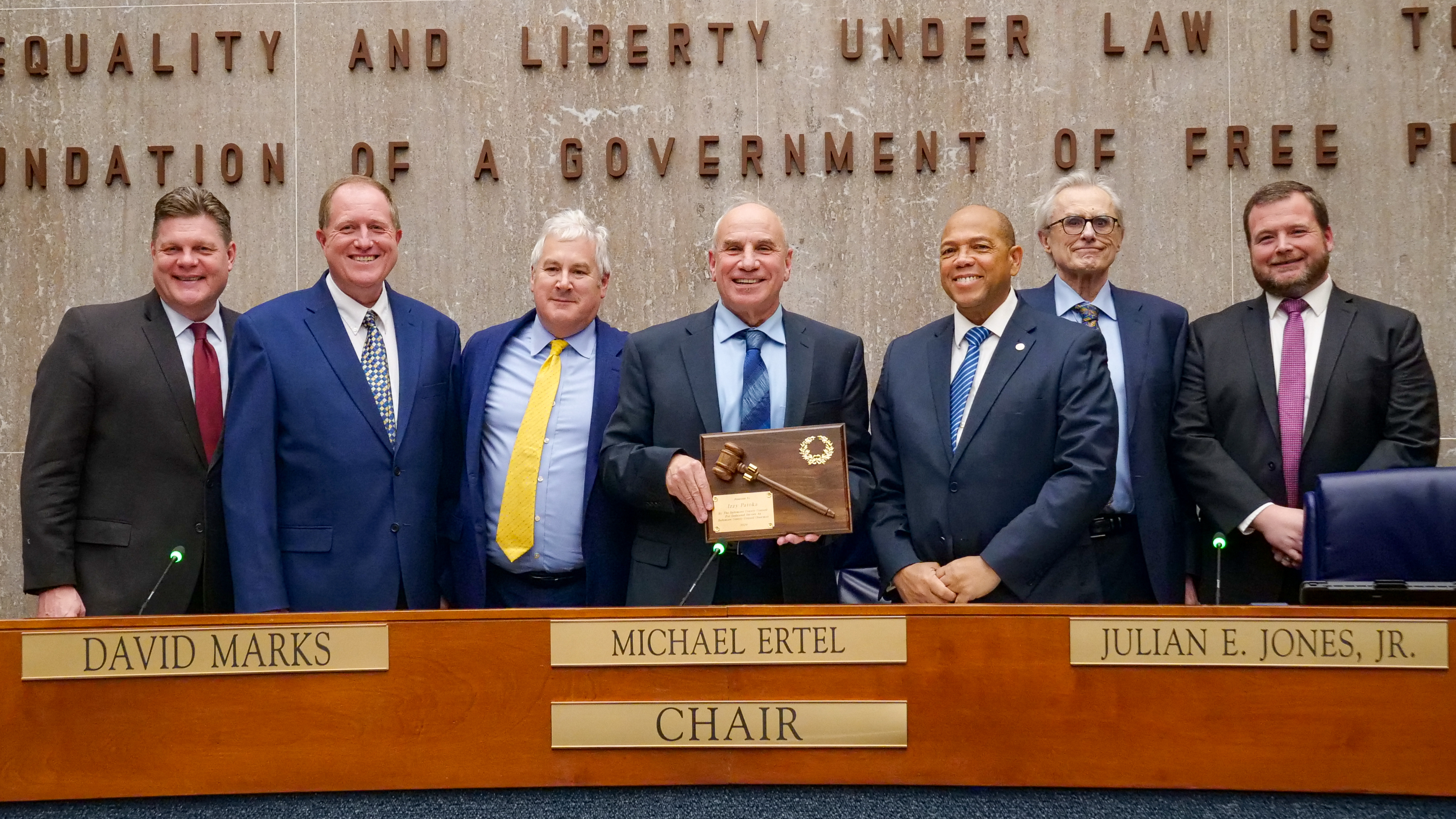
Members of the Baltimore County Council, 2022–2026

As of June 2026, the council has 4 Democrats and 3 Republicans.

Baltimore County Council Membership
District	Name	Party
District 1	Pat Young	Democratic
District 2	Izzy Patoka	Democratic
District 3	Nino Mangione	Republican
District 4	Julian E. Jones Jr.	Democratic
District 5	David S. Marks	Republican
District 6	Mike Ertel	Democratic
District 7	Todd K. Crandell	Republican

==== Baltimore County Council Historical Membership ====
Name	Years served	District	Party	Notes
Vicki Almond	2010–2018	2	D	
Joseph Bartenfelder	1994–2010	6	D	
Cathy Bevins	2010–2022	6	D	
Vincent Gardina	1990–2010	5	D	
Todd Huff	2010–2014	3	R	
Kevin B. Kamenetz	1994–2010	2	D	
S. G. Samuel Moxley	1994–2010	1	D	
Kenneth Oliver	2002–2014	4	D	
John A. Olszewski Sr.	1998–2014	7	D	
Thomas E. Quirk	2010–2022	1	D	
T. Bryan McIntire	1994–2010	3	R	
Louis L. DePazzo	1994–1998	7	D	
Douglas B. Riley	1990-1998	4	R	
Berchie Lee Manley	1990-1994	1	R	
Melvin G. Mintz	1986-1994	2	D	
C. A. (Dutch) Ruppersberger III	1985-1994	3	D	
William A. Howard IV	1990-1994	6	R	
Donald C. Mason	1990–1994	7	D	

=== Politics ===
Baltimore County is somewhat of a bellwether for Maryland politics. While it leans slightly Republican compared to the state as a whole, Republicans running for statewide office must carry it solidly to win a statewide election.

After going Republican in all but one presidential election from 1944 to 1988, it has voted for the Democratic candidate for president in each election since 1992. Along with neighboring Howard County, it has voted for the state-wide presidential winner in 10 straight elections, the longest such streak in the state. However, in gubernatorial elections, it has often gone Republican (1994, 1998, 2006) even as a Democratic candidate was elected governor. In the 2014 gubernatorial election Republican Larry Hogan won Baltimore County by over 20 points (59.03% to 38.89%).

Voter registration and party enrollment as of March 2024
Democratic	306,276	53.59%
Republican	137,055	23.98%
Unaffiliated	117,601	20.58%
Libertarian	2,661	0.47%
Other parties	7,879	1.38%
Total	571,472	100%

United States presidential election results for Baltimore County, Maryland
Year	Republican / Whig		Democratic		Third party(ies)	
Year	No.	%	No.	%	No.	%
1824	3,980	40.53%	0	0.00%	5,840	59.47%
1828	5,917	43.37%	7,725	56.63%	0	0.00%
1832	4,248	34.88%	7,930	65.12%	0	0.00%
1836	6,699	44.90%	8,222	55.10%	0	0.00%
1840	9,237	48.15%	9,946	51.85%	0	0.00%
1844	10,714	48.01%	11,602	51.99%	0	0.00%
1848	13,001	48.61%	13,664	51.09%	79	0.30%
1852	2,527	48.57%	2,669	51.30%	7	0.13%
1856	8	0.12%	3,155	47.32%	3,504	52.56%
1860	37	0.52%	449	6.25%	6,693	93.23%
1864	2,402	50.11%	2,391	49.89%	0	0.00%
1868	2,335	34.79%	4,377	65.21%	0	0.00%
1872	3,774	47.49%	4,173	52.51%	0	0.00%
1876	5,001	40.64%	7,304	59.36%	0	0.00%
1880	5,351	42.16%	7,321	57.68%	21	0.17%
1884	6,257	43.63%	7,856	54.78%	227	1.58%
1888	5,224	43.06%	6,464	53.28%	443	3.65%
1892	5,165	40.10%	7,225	56.09%	490	3.80%
1896	9,211	53.59%	7,110	41.37%	867	5.04%
1900	9,348	49.23%	9,147	48.18%	492	2.59%
1904	7,570	43.89%	9,394	54.47%	282	1.64%
1908	10,197	48.60%	10,297	49.08%	488	2.33%
1912	4,247	19.03%	11,524	51.65%	6,541	29.32%
1916	12,633	44.47%	15,226	53.60%	547	1.93%
1920	12,432	56.04%	9,365	42.22%	386	1.74%
1924	9,383	43.32%	9,424	43.51%	2,854	13.18%
1928	23,889	60.17%	15,632	39.37%	180	0.45%
1932	13,938	35.29%	24,626	62.35%	930	2.35%
1936	18,893	39.71%	28,367	59.62%	316	0.66%
1940	26,652	46.60%	30,360	53.08%	186	0.33%
1944	34,047	56.44%	26,275	43.56%	0	0.00%
1948	41,846	56.18%	31,883	42.80%	761	1.02%
1952	81,898	62.59%	48,476	37.04%	484	0.37%
1956	104,021	68.30%	48,270	31.70%	0	0.00%
1960	96,027	50.43%	94,396	49.57%	0	0.00%
1964	77,870	39.92%	117,153	60.06%	50	0.03%
1968	108,930	49.74%	80,798	36.89%	29,283	13.37%
1972	175,897	70.30%	70,309	28.10%	4,018	1.61%
1976	143,293	54.73%	118,505	45.27%	0	0.00%
1980	132,490	47.33%	121,280	43.33%	26,147	9.34%
1984	171,929	61.31%	106,908	38.12%	1,591	0.57%
1988	163,881	57.04%	121,570	42.32%	1,844	0.64%
1992	126,728	39.21%	143,498	44.40%	52,994	16.40%
1996	114,449	42.39%	132,599	49.12%	22,920	8.49%
2000	133,033	43.75%	160,635	52.83%	10,416	3.43%
2004	166,051	46.98%	182,474	51.62%	4,954	1.40%
2008	158,714	41.66%	214,151	56.22%	8,073	2.12%
2012	154,908	40.26%	220,322	57.26%	9,552	2.48%
2016	149,477	38.26%	218,412	55.91%	22,793	5.83%
2020	146,202	35.24%	258,409	62.28%	10,321	2.49%
2024	149,560	36.22%	249,958	60.53%	13,397	3.24%

=== Federal government ===
Baltimore County is represented by Republican Andy Harris of Maryland's 1st congressional district, Democrat Johnny Olszewski of the 2nd district, and Democrat Kweisi Mfume of the 7th district.

== Geography ==
According to the U.S. census bureau, the county covers 682 square miles (1,770 km^{2}), 598 square miles (1,550 km^{2}) of which is land and 83 square miles (210 km^{2}) (12%) of which is water. It is the third-largest county in Maryland by land area. The larger portion of the terrain consists of hills often rising to a height of 800 feet (240 m) above tide water.

The highest elevation is approximately 960 feet (290 m) above sea level at Maryland's state border with Pennsylvania near Steltz. The lowest elevation is sea level along the shoreline of the Chesapeake Bay.

Much of the county is suburban, straddling the border between the Piedmont plateau to the northwest and in the southern and southeastern regions of the county bordering the Patapsco River and the Chesapeake Bay, the Atlantic coastal plain. Northern Baltimore County is primarily rural, with a landscape of rolling hills and deciduous forests characteristic of the Southeastern mixed forests and shares the geography with its neighbors to the east and west, Carroll County and Harford County, and going north across the historic Mason–Dixon line into Adams County and York County in south central Pennsylvania.

=== Climate ===
The county has a humid subtropical climate (Cfa) except in the northern tier where a hot-summer humid continental climate (Dfa) exists. Average monthly temperatures in Towson range from 33.3 °F in January to 76.9 °F in July. The county has three hardiness zones: 6b in some higher northern areas, 7a in most of the county by area, and 7b in areas close enough to the Chesapeake Bay or the City of Baltimore.

=== Adjacent counties and independent city ===
- York County, Pennsylvania (north)
- Carroll County (west)
- Harford County (east)
- Anne Arundel County (south)
- Kent County (southeast)
- Howard County (southwest)
- Baltimore City (south)

=== National protected area ===
- Hampton National Historic Site

=== State protected area ===
- Soldiers Delight Natural Environment Area

== Transportation ==
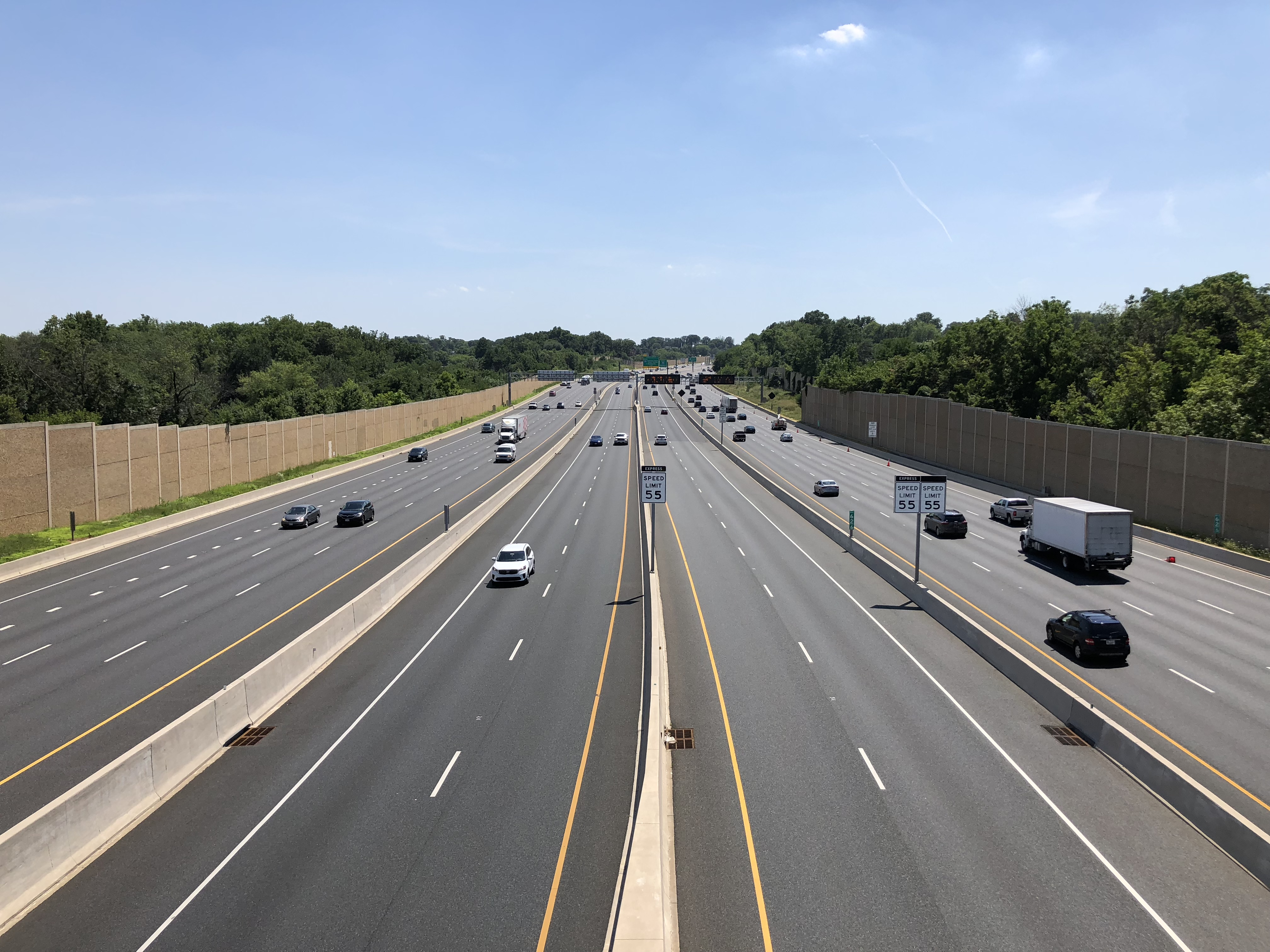
I-95 in eastern Baltimore County

=== Major roads and highways ===
- I-70
- I-83
- I-95
- I-195
- I-695
- I-795
- I-895
- US 1
  - US 1 Alt.
- US 40
- MD 7
- MD 25
- MD 26
- MD 30
- MD 41
- MD 43
- MD 45
- MD 88
- MD 91
- MD 122
- MD 125
- MD 129
- MD 130
- MD 131
- MD 133
- MD 134
- MD 137
- MD 138
- MD 139
- MD 140
- MD 144
- MD 145
- MD 146
- MD 147
- MD 150
- MD 151
- MD 165
- MD 166
- MD 295
- MD 372
- MD 439
- MD 542
- MD 562
- MD 648
- MD 695
- MD 700
- MD 702
- MD 940

=== Transit ===
The Maryland Transit Administration (MTA) operates three rail systems—one light rail, one rapid transit, and one commuter rail—in the Baltimore area; all three systems have stations in Baltimore County. The heavy-rail Metro SubwayLink runs northwest of the city to Owings Mills; the Light RailLink system runs north of Baltimore City to Hunt Valley and south of the city through Baltimore Highlands with some routes terminating at Baltimore/Washington International Thurgood Marshall Airport, Maryland. Commuter MARC Train service is available in the county at Halethorpe, St. Denis, and Martin State Airport stations.

The MTA's local and regional bus services also serve Baltimore County.

=== Rail ===
Both CSX Transportation and Amtrak mainlines run through the county. Former rail lines running through the County beginning in the 19th Century were the Maryland and Pennsylvania Railroad (MPR) and the Northern Central Railway (previously the Baltimore and Susquehanna Railroad, later becoming part of the old Pennsylvania Railroad). MPR and parts of the Northern Central were abandoned. The present-day streetcar/trolley line coming north from Anne Arundel County and the International Airport through Baltimore City uses the Northern Central right-of-way south of Cockeysville and Timonium; starting slightly north of that, the right-of-way was converted into the popular hiking, biking and jogging pathway from Cockeysville to the Mason–Dixon line with Pennsylvania known now as the Torrey C. Brown Rail Trail, named for a former state secretary of natural resources.

== Demographics ==
Historical population
Census	Pop.	Note	%±
1790	38,937		—
1800	59,030		51.6%
1810	75,780		28.4%
1820	96,201		26.9%
1830	120,870		25.6%
1840	134,379		11.2%
1850	210,646		56.8%
1860	54,135		−74.3%
1870	63,387		17.1%
1880	83,336		31.5%
1890	72,909		−12.5%
1900	90,755		24.5%
1910	122,349		34.8%
1920	74,817		−38.8%
1930	124,565		66.5%
1940	155,825		25.1%
1950	270,273		73.4%
1960	492,428		82.2%
1970	621,077		26.1%
1980	655,615		5.6%
1990	692,134		5.6%
2000	754,292		9.0%
2010	805,029		6.7%
2020	854,535		6.1%
2025 (est.)	847,650	▼	−0.8%
Population before 1860 includes town and (1797) city of Baltimore. Population decline in 1890 and 1920 census figures reflect annexations by the City of Baltimore. 1790–1960 1900–1990; 1990–2000 2010 2020

=== 2020 census ===
As of the 2020 census, the county had a population of 854,535. The median age was 39.3 years; 21.7% of residents were under the age of 18 and 17.7% were 65 years of age or older. For every 100 females there were 89.6 males and for every 100 females age 18 and over there were 86.0 males age 18 and over. 92.9% of residents lived in urban areas, while 7.1% lived in rural areas.

The racial makeup of the county was 52.9% White, 29.9% Black or African American, 0.4% American Indian and Alaska Native, 6.4% Asian, 0.0% Native Hawaiian and Pacific Islander, 4.0% from some other race, and 6.3% from two or more races. Hispanic or Latino residents of any race comprised 7.2% of the population.

There were 329,964 households in the county, of which 30.5% had children under the age of 18 living with them and 32.5% had a female householder with no spouse or partner present. About 28.5% of all households were made up of individuals and 12.6% had someone living alone who was 65 years of age or older.

There were 350,163 housing units, of which 5.8% were vacant. Among occupied housing units, 64.0% were owner-occupied and 36.0% were renter-occupied. The homeowner vacancy rate was 1.4% and the rental vacancy rate was 7.1%.

=== Racial and ethnic composition ===
Baltimore County, Maryland – Racial and ethnic composition Note: the US Census treats Hispanic/Latino as an ethnic category. This table excludes Latinos from the racial categories and assigns them to a separate category. Hispanics/Latinos may be of any race.
Race / Ethnicity (NH = Non-Hispanic)	Pop 1980	Pop 1990	Pop 2000	Pop 2010	Pop 2020	% 1980	% 1990	% 2000	% 2010	% 2020
White alone (NH)	586,204	582,397	553,890	504,556	443,263	89.41%	84.15%	73.43%	62.68%	51.87%
Black or African American alone (NH)	53,598	84,648	150,456	206,913	252,724	8.18%	12.23%	19.95%	25.70%	29.57%
Native American or Alaska Native alone (NH)	773	1,417	1,769	2,107	1,942	0.12%	0.20%	0.23%	0.26%	0.23%
Asian alone (NH)	8,524	15,229	23,845	39,865	54,701	1.30%	2.20%	3.16%	4.95%	6.40%
Native Hawaiian or Pacific Islander alone (NH)	x	x	195	255	252	x	x	0.03%	0.03%	0.03%
Other race alone (NH)	1,122	312	1,016	1,445	4,461	0.17%	0.05%	0.13%	0.18%	0.52%
Mixed race or Multiracial (NH)	x	x	9,347	16,153	35,700	x	x	1.24%	2.01%	4.18%
Hispanic or Latino (any race)	5,394	8,131	13,774	33,735	61,492	0.82%	1.17%	1.83%	4.19%	7.20%
Total	655,615	692,134	754,292	805,029	854,535	100.00%	100.00%	100.00%	100.00%	100.00%

Racial / Ethnic Profile of places in Baltimore County, Maryland (2020 Census)
Following is a table of cities, villages, and census designated places in Baltimore County, Maryland. Data for the United States (with and without Puerto Rico), the state of Maryland, and Baltimore County itself have been included for comparison purposes.
The majority racial/ethnic group is coded per the key below. Communities that extend into and adjacent county or counties are delineated with a ‡ followed by an accompanying explanatory note. The full population of each community has been tabulated including the population in adjacent counties.

Majority minority with no dominant group
Majority White
Majority Black
Majority Hispanic
Majority Asian

Racial and ethnic composition of places in Baltmore County (2020 Census) (NH = Non-Hispanic) Note: the US Census treats Hispanic/Latino as an ethnic category. This table excludes Latinos from the racial categories and assigns them to a separate category. Hispanics/Latinos may be of any race.
Place	Designation	Total Population	White alone (NH)	%	Black or African American alone (NH)	%	Native American or Alaska Native alone (NH)	%	Asian alone (NH)	%	Pacific Islander alone (NH)	%	Other race alone (NH)	%	Mixed race or Multiracial (NH)	%	Hispanic or Latino (any race)	%
United States of America (50 states and D.C.)	x	331,449,281	191,697,647	57.84%	39,940,338	12.05%	2,251,699	0.68%	19,618,719	5.92%	622,018	0.19%	1,689,833	0.51%	13,548,983	4.09%	62,080,044	18.73%
United States of America (50 states, D.C., and Puerto Rico)	x	334,735,155	191,722,195	57.28%	39,944,624	11.93%	2,252,011	0.67%	19,621,465	5.86%	622,109	0.19%	1,692,341	0.51%	13,551,323	4.05%	65,329,087	19.52%
Maryland	State	6,177,224	2,913,782	47.17%	1,795,027	29.06%	12,055	0.20%	417,962	6.77%	2,575	0.04%	35,314	0.57%	270,764	4.38%	729,745	11.81%
Baltimore County	County	854,535	443,263	51.87%	252,724	29.57%	1,942	0.23%	54,701	6.40%	252	0.03%	4,461	0.52%	35,700	4.18%	61,492	7.20%
Arbutus	CDP	21,655	13,657	63.07%	2,569	11.86%	40	0.18%	3,093	14.28%	1	0.00%	85	0.39%	1,153	5.32%	1,057	4.88%
Baltimore Highlands	CDP	7,740	3,408	44.03%	1,550	20.03%	18	0.23%	300	3.88%	3	0.04%	59	0.76%	403	5.21%	1,999	25.83%
Bowleys Quarters	CDP	6,853	4,942	72.11%	1,231	17.96%	17	0.25%	106	1.55%	3	0.04%	25	0.36%	296	4.32%	233	3.40%
Carney	CDP	29,363	17,906	60.98%	6,486	22.09%	41	0.14%	2,125	7.24%	14	0.05%	123	0.42%	1,226	4.18%	1,442	4.91%
Catonsville	CDP	44,701	29,150	65.21%	6,616	14.80%	69	0.15%	4,122	9.22%	15	0.03%	250	0.56%	2,145	4.80%	2,334	5.22%
Cockeysville	CDP	24,184	12,167	50.31%	4,812	19.90%	49	0.20%	2,828	11.69%	17	0.07%	129	0.53%	892	3.69%	3,290	13.60%
Dundalk	CDP	67,796	42,558	62.77%	9,523	14.05%	473	0.70%	1,371	2.02%	18	0.03%	296	0.44%	3,912	5.77%	9,645	14.23%
Edgemere	CDP	9,069	7,930	87.44%	368	4.06%	24	0.26%	55	0.61%	2	0.02%	27	0.30%	418	4.61%	245	2.70%
Essex	CDP	40,505	21,129	52.16%	12,613	31.14%	195	0.48%	852	2.10%	14	0.03%	270	0.67%	2,187	5.40%	3,245	8.01%
Garrison	CDP	9,487	4,257	44.87%	4,070	42.90%	11	0.12%	413	4.35%	0	0.00%	37	0.39%	304	3.20%	395	4.16%
Hampton	CDP	5,180	4,387	84.69%	114	2.20%	7	0.14%	324	6.25%	3	0.06%	17	0.33%	194	3.75%	134	2.59%
Honeygo	CDP	12,927	8,296	64.18%	1,463	11.32%	17	0.13%	2,107	16.30%	0	0.00%	45	0.35%	550	4.25%	449	3.47%
Kingsville	CDP	4,358	3,957	90.80%	45	1.03%	4	0.09%	58	1.33%	11	0.25%	11	0.25%	122	2.80%	150	3.44%
Lansdowne	CDP	9,004	4,094	45.47%	2,098	23.30%	20	0.22%	373	4.14%	4	0.04%	69	0.77%	476	5.29%	1,870	20.77%
Lochearn	CDP	25,511	2,272	8.91%	20,502	80.37%	58	0.23%	360	1.41%	3	0.01%	139	0.54%	789	3.09%	1,388	5.44%
Lutherville	CDP	6,835	5,180	75.79%	262	3.83%	10	0.15%	678	9.92%	9	0.13%	47	0.69%	317	4.64%	332	4.86%
Mays Chapel	CDP	12,224	9,265	75.79%	341	2.79%	4	0.03%	1,693	13.85%	3	0.02%	26	0.21%	437	3.57%	455	3.72%
Middle River	CDP	33,203	16,202	48.80%	10,704	32.24%	109	0.33%	1,451	4.37%	6	0.02%	145	0.44%	1,730	5.21%	2,856	8.60%
Milford Mill	CDP	30,622	1,696	5.54%	25,360	82.82%	57	0.19%	698	2.28%	7	0.02%	172	0.56%	885	2.89%	1,747	5.71%
Overlea	CDP	12,832	7,344	57.23%	3,481	27.13%	41	0.32%	613	4.78%	3	0.02%	71	0.55%	553	4.31%	726	5.66%
Owings Mills	CDP	35,674	6,940	19.45%	21,214	59.47%	49	0.14%	2,536	7.11%	11	0.03%	223	0.63%	1,238	3.47%	3,463	9.71%
Parkville	CDP	31,812	14,722	46.28%	11,937	37.52%	80	0.25%	1,167	3.67%	11	0.03%	203	0.64%	1,340	4.21%	2,352	7.39%
Perry Hall	CDP	29,409	18,554	63.09%	4,528	15.40%	45	0.15%	3,832	13.03%	9	0.03%	120	0.41%	1,216	4.13%	1,105	3.76%
Pikesville	CDP	34,168	22,986	67.27%	6,511	19.06%	34	0.10%	1,709	5.00%	12	0.04%	280	0.82%	1,076	3.15%	1,560	4.57%
Randallstown	CDP	33,655	3,253	9.67%	27,152	80.68%	46	0.14%	658	1.96%	8	0.02%	202	0.60%	1,123	3.34%	1,213	3.60%
Reisterstown	CDP	25,968	13,771	53.03%	7,455	28.71%	46	0.18%	1,623	6.25%	16	0.06%	57	0.22%	678	2.61%	2,322	8.94%
Rosedale	CDP	19,961	8,181	40.98%	7,833	39.24%	60	0.30%	1,296	6.49%	11	0.06%	94	0.47%	749	3.75%	1,737	8.70%
Rossville	CDP	16,029	5,485	34.22%	6,739	42.04%	40	0.25%	1,723	10.75%	5	0.03%	111	0.69%	627	3.91%	1,299	8.10%
Timonium	CDP	10,458	7,978	76.29%	521	4.98%	8	0.08%	1,065	10.18%	0	0.00%	24	0.23%	341	3.26%	521	4.98%
Towson	CDP	59,553	39,503	66.33%	10,218	17.16%	67	0.11%	3,760	6.31%	13	0.02%	219	0.37%	2,510	4.21%	3,263	5.48%
White Marsh	CDP	10,287	6,298	61.22%	1,547	15.04%	11	0.11%	1,523	14.81%	0	0.00%	37	0.36%	422	4.10%	449	4.36%
Woodlawn	CDP	39,986	6,235	15.59%	22,339	55.87%	80	0.20%	6,190	15.48%	8	0.02%	292	0.73%	1,383	3.46%	3,459	8.65%

=== 2010 census ===
As of the 2010 United States census, 805,029 people, 316,715 households, and 205,113 families resided there. The population density was 1,345.5 inhabitants per square mile (519.5/km^{2}). The 335,622 housing units supported an average density of 561.0 per square mile (216.6/km^{2}). The racial makeup of the county was 64.6% white, 26.1% black or African American, 5.0% Asian, 0.3% American Indian, 1.6% from other races, and 2.4% from two or more races. Those of Hispanic or Latino origin made up 4.2% of the population. In terms of ancestry, 20.7% were German, 14.6% were Irish, 8.7% were English, 7.4% were Italian, 5.8% were Polish and 5.0% were American.

Of the 316,715 households, 31.4% had children under the age of 18 living with them, 45.5% were married couples living together, 14.5% had a female householder with no husband present, 35.2% were non-families, and 28.3% of all households were made up of individuals. The average household size was 2.48 and the average family size was 3.04. The median age was 39.1 years.

The household median income was $63,959 and the median income for a family was $78,385. Males had a median income of $53,104 versus $43,316 for females. The per capita income for the county was $33,719. About 5.3% of families and 8.1% of the population were below the poverty line, including 10.1% of those under age 18 and 7.6% of those age 65 or over.

== Economy ==
Among the county's major employers are MedStar Franklin Square Medical Center on the east side in Rossville, the Social Security Administration, the national headquarters of which are in Woodlawn, and The Black & Decker Corporation, in Towson. As of 2009, the county's workforce totaled 410,100, with 25% employed in the fields of education, health and human services, 10% in retailing, and less than 1% in agriculture.

=== Top employers ===
According to the county's 2011 Comprehensive Annual Financial Report, the top employers in the county are concentrated in the government, medical and educational fields. The only commercial entity is Erickson Living:

#	Employer	# of Employees
1	Social Security Administration/CMS	14,948
2	Baltimore County Public Schools	14,608
3	Baltimore County	8,429
4	MedStar Franklin Square Medical Center	3,500
5	Towson University	3,344
6	Greater Baltimore Medical Center	3,331
7	St. Joseph Medical Center	3,330
8	University of Maryland, Baltimore County	3,258
9	Erickson Living	3,070
10	The Sheppard and Enoch Pratt Hospital	2,380

=== Agriculture ===
The University of Maryland Extension system provides Extension for the county. The state Farm Bureau oversees the County Farm Bureau here.

Switchgrass (Panicum virgatum) is a potential energy crop and soil improver however it does not compete well with some warm-season annual grass weeds and broadleaf weeds here. Sadeghpour et al., 2014 finds that various winter cereals including oat and rye are helpful covers for weed control, rye moreso than oat. However they still found that herbicide (specifically atrazine or quinclorac) is needed as supplemental weed control. Osipitan et al., 2018 believe this result generalizes to early season cover cropping for weed control in general.

== Education ==
=== Colleges and universities ===
The University System of Maryland maintains two universities in Baltimore County:

- Towson University in Towson, (founded 1866 as Maryland State Normal School in Baltimore City; renamed Maryland State Teachers College at Towson, 1935; Towson State College, 1963; Towson State University, 1976, Towson University, 1997).
- University of Maryland, Baltimore County in Catonsville, founded 1966.

The two private colleges in Baltimore County are:

- Goucher College (in Towson), founded as Women's College of Baltimore, 1885.
- Stevenson University, formerly Villa Julie College (campuses in Stevenson and Owings Mills).

Other schools with a campus in Baltimore County:

- Loyola University Maryland (in Hunt Valley, main campus in Baltimore at North Charles Street and East Cold Spring Lane, [formerly Loyola College, founded 1852]).
- The Community College of Baltimore County (CCBC), with campuses in Catonsville, Essex, and Dundalk.

=== Public schools ===
All public schools in Baltimore County are operated by Baltimore County Public Schools, the sole school district in the county, with the exception of the Imagine Me Charter School, which opened August 2008.

=== Private schools ===
Baltimore County has a number of private schools at the K-12 grade levels. Among them are:

- Arlington Baptist High School
- Baltimore Actors Theatre Conservatory
- Beth Tfiloh Dahan Community School
- The Boys' Latin School of Maryland
- Calvert Hall College High School
- Cambridge School of Baltimore
- Concordia Preparatory School
- Garrison Forest School
- Immaculate Conception School
- Jemicy School
- Loyola Blakefield
- Maryvale Preparatory School
- McDonogh School
- Mount de Sales Academy
- Notre Dame Preparatory School
- Oldfields School (all-girls')
- Our Lady of Grace School
- Our Lady of Mt. Carmel
- The Park School
- St. James Academy in Monkton
- St. Paul's School & St. Paul's School for Girls
- St. Timothy's School (all-girls')

== Communities ==
=== Census-designated places ===
All areas in Baltimore County are unincorporated and have no legal jurisdiction over their area.

The following census-designated places recognized by the U.S. Census Bureau:

- Arbutus
- Baltimore Highlands
- Bowleys Quarters
- Carney
- Catonsville
- Cockeysville
- Dundalk
- Edgemere
- Essex
- Garrison
- Hampton
- Honeygo
- Kingsville
- Lansdowne
- Lochearn
- Lutherville
- Mays Chapel
- Middle River
- Milford Mill
- Overlea
- Owings Mills
- Parkville
- Perry Hall
- Pikesville
- Randallstown
- Reisterstown
- Rosedale
- Rossville
- Timonium
- Towson (county seat)
- White Marsh
- Woodlawn

=== Unincorporated communities ===
Although not formally Census-Designated Places, these other communities are known locally and, in many cases, have their own post offices and are shown on roadmaps:

- Baldwin
- Boring
- Bradshaw
- Brooklandville
- Butler
- Chase
- Fork
- Fort Howard
- Germantown
- Glen Arm
- Glencoe
- Glyndon
- Halethorpe
- Hereford
- Hunt Valley
- Hydes
- Jacksonville
- Long Green
- Maryland Line
- Monkton
- Nottingham
- Oella
- Parkton
- Phoenix
- Ruxton
- Sparks
- Sparrows Point
- Stevenson
- Trump
- Turners Station
- Upper Falls
- Upperco
- White Hall

== Notable people ==
- Spiro Agnew, former Vice President of the United States, Baltimore County Executive, and governor of Maryland
- Holmes Alexander (1906–1985), historian, journalist, columnist, and member of the Maryland House of Delegates
- All Time Low, punk-rock band, formed in 2003
- Peter Angelos, prominent attorney and owner, Baltimore Orioles
- Brian Balmages, composer
- Mario Dewar Barrett, famous R&B singer
- Mark Belanger, former Oriole shortstop
- Ryan Boyle, professional lacrosse player
- A. J. Burnett, MLB pitcher
- David Byrne, lead singer Talking Heads
- Tom Clancy, well-known author of political thrillers
- Kevin Clash, puppeteer most famous for Sesame Street's Elmo
- Louis S. Diggs, Baltimore County historian
- Samuel Durrance, astronaut/physicist
- Robert Ehrlich, 60th Governor of Maryland
- Jane Frank (1918–1986) artist (born in Baltimore, lived in Owings Mills and Towson most of her adult life)
- Cinder Road. Band named after a road in Lutherville
- Lee Gatch, artist (born in a small rural community near Baltimore)
- Jim Gentile, former Oriole and Dodger first baseman
- Conor Gill, professional lacrosse player
- Ira Glass, host and producer of This American Life
- Elaine Hamilton-O'Neal, abstract expressionist artist and Fulbright scholar
- William H. Harrison (USMC), brigadier general in the Marine Corps during World War II
- Emily Spencer Hayden, photographer
- Billy Hunter, former major league baseball shortstop and manager
- Foxhall P. Keene, horse breeder and Olympic gold medalist polo player
- Stacy Keibler, actress and model
- Harvey Ladew, designer of Ladew Topiary Gardens
- Bucky Lasek, famous vert ramp skateboarder, from Dundalk
- Hae Min Lee, Murder victim
- G. E. Lowman, clergyman and early radio evangelist
- Carol Mann, golfer
- Luigi Mangione, accused murderer
- Jamie Miller, drummer Bad Religion
- Jim McKay, ABC-TV sportscaster
- Sid Meier, businessman and computer programmer.
- John Merryman, Civil War militia officer, Maryland politician, and subject of the landmark habeas corpus case, Ex parte Merryman
- Glenn Milstead, known as the actor "Divine"
- Mo'Nique, American comedian and actress
- Jim Palmer, former Baltimore Oriole and Hall of Fame pitcher
- Michael Phelps, Olympic Gold-Medalist swimmer
- Rosa Ponselle, opera singer
- Robin Quivers, radio personality
- Ross Rawlings, pianist, composer, conductor, and music director
- Angel Reese, women's basketball player
- Charles Carnan Ridgely (1760–1829), governor of Maryland and master of the Hampton estate
- Eliza Ridgely (1803–1867), third mistress of the Hampton estate and the subject of the well-known portrait painting Lady with a Harp
- Brooks Robinson, former Baltimore Oriole and Hall of Fame third baseman
- Mike Rowe, TV show host for Dirty Jobs
- Don Shula, Former Baltimore Colts player and later coach of the Miami Dolphins
- Dick Szymanski, former Colts player
- Pam Shriver, professional tennis player, Olympic Gold Medalist in tennis
- Kathleen Kennedy Townsend, politician and member of the Kennedy family
- Gus Triandos, former Baltimore Oriole
- Bob Turley, former major league baseball pitcher
- Johnny Unitas, former Baltimore Colt and Hall of Fame quarterback
- Nikolai Volkoff, former professional wrestler and member of the WWE Hall of Fame
- Daniel Bashiel Warner, third President of Liberia
- John Waters, filmmaker
- Cheryl Wheeler, singer-songwriter
- Ella B. Ensor Wilson (1838–1913), social reformer

== See also ==
- Baltimore County District Courthouses
- National Register of Historic Places listings in Baltimore County, Maryland
