= Immaculate Conception School =

Immaculate Conception School may refer to:

== In the Philippines ==
- Immaculate Conception School for Boys, Malolos City, Bulacan

== In the United States ==
- Immaculate Conception School in Towson, Maryland
- Immaculate Conception Church and School in Omaha, Nebraska
- Immaculate Conception School in Tuckahoe, New York
- Immaculate Conception Church, School, and Rectory in Cincinnati, Ohio
