= Lochearn, Maryland =

- Census-designated place
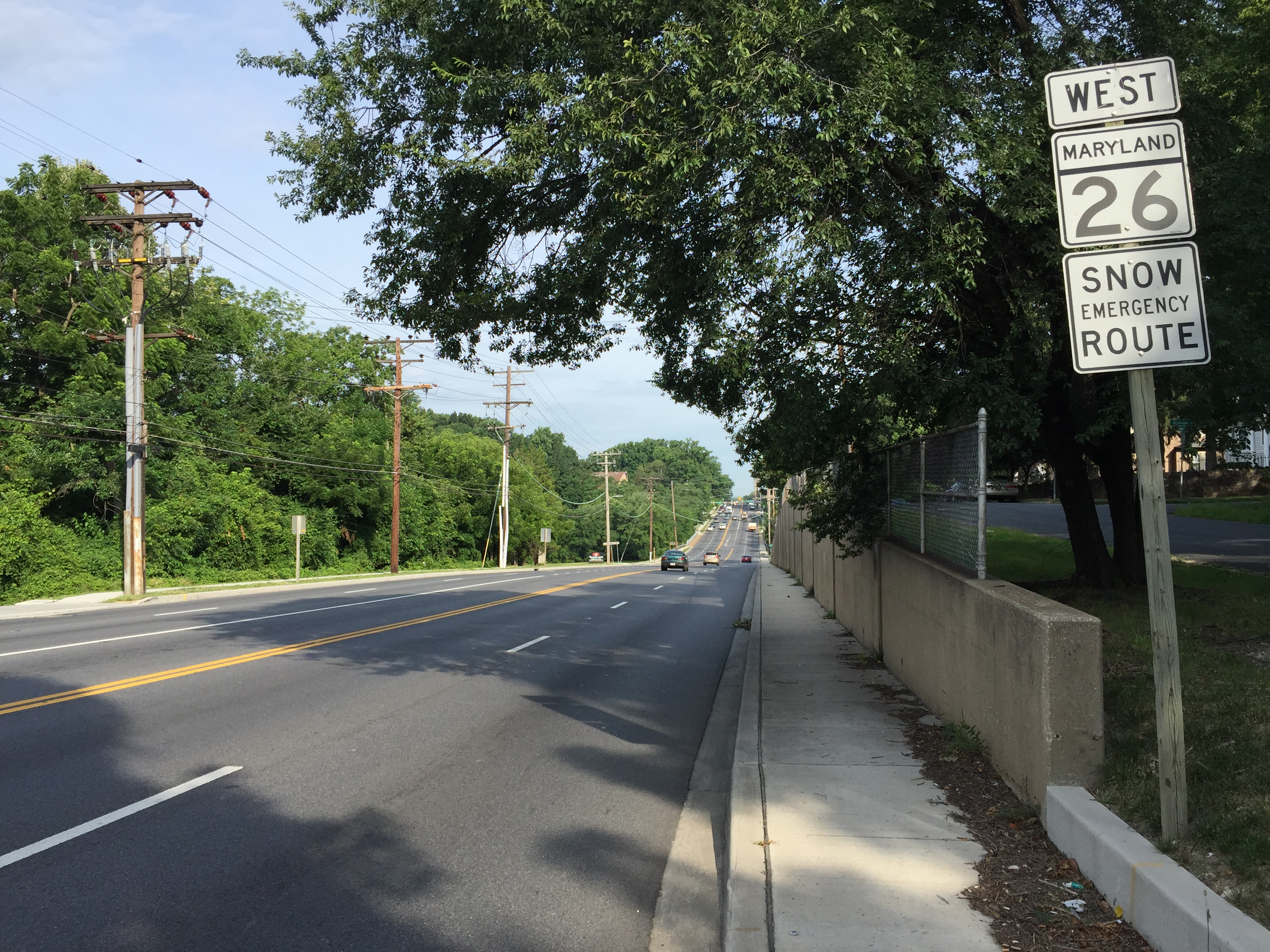
- Liberty Road at Liberty Terrace in Lochearn, Maryland

- Location of Lochearn, Maryland
- Coordinates: 39°21′2″N 76°43′47″W
- Country: United States
- State: Maryland
- County: Baltimore
- Established: 1882

Area
  - Total: 5.62 sq mi (14.56 km^{2})
  - Land: 5.59 sq mi (14.48 km^{2})
  - Water: 0.031 sq mi (0.08 km^{2})
- Elevation: 413 ft (126 m)

Population (2020)
  - Total: 25,511
  - Density: 4,563.4/sq mi (1,761.92/km^{2})
- Time zone: UTC−5 (Eastern (EST))
  - Summer (DST): UTC−4 (EDT)
- ZIP Code: 21207, 21208, 21215
- FIPS code: 24-47450
- GNIS feature ID: 0590686

Lochearn is an unincorporated community and census-designated place in Baltimore County, Maryland, United States, located immediately to the west of the City of Baltimore. Per the 2020 census, the population was 25,511.

== Geography ==
Lochearn is bordered on the east by the Baltimore City line, on the south by Gwynn Oak Avenue, Woodlawn Drive, and Dogwood Road, on the west by the Baltimore Beltway, and on the northeast by the Baltimore Metro transit line, including the Milford Mill station. Woodmoor shopping center is located on Essex and Liberty roads.

Lochearn is located at 39°21′02″N 76°43′47″W (39.350630, −76.729755). According to the United States Census Bureau, the CDP has a total area of 5.6 square miles (15 km^{2}), of which 0.04 square miles (0.10 km^{2}), or 0.36%, is water.

=== Major surface thoroughfares serving Lochearn ===
- Essex Road
- Liberty Road (Maryland Route 26) to Liberty Heights Avenue starting after Kelox Road and Northern Parkway in Baltimore City.
- Milford Mill Road
- Patterson Avenue (Baltimore) starting in Baltimore County in Lochearn to the Baltimore City line at Alter Street to Wabash Avenue, then Reisterstown Road. (Reisterstown Plaza is on the left hand side.)

=== Neighborhoods within Lochearn ===
- Brighton (part of Brighton is in Baltimore City)
- Milford
- Villa Nova
- Campfield Gardens
- Lochearn
- Forest Gardens
- Sudbrook Park
- Willow Glen
- Williamsburg/ Park Hill

=== Climate ===
The climate in this area is characterized by hot, humid summers and generally mild to cool winters. According to the Köppen Climate Classification system, Lochearn has a humid subtropical climate, abbreviated "Cfa" on climate maps.

== Transportation ==
=== Roads ===
The main road that runs through Lochearn is Liberty Road. Smaller roads serving individual communities include Buckingham Road, Croydon Road, Elba Drive, Essex Road, Lugine Avenue, Patterson Avenue, and St. Lukes Lane.

=== Public transportation ===
The Maryland Transit Administration's CityLink Lime Bus runs along Liberty Road through Lochearn.

== Demographics ==
Historical population
Census	Pop.	Note	%±
1980	26,908		—
1990	25,240		−6.2%
2000	25,269		0.1%
2010	25,333		0.3%
2020	25,511		0.7%
U.S. Decennial Census; 2010 2020

=== Racial and ethnic composition ===
Lochearn CDP, Maryland – Racial and ethnic composition Note: the US Census treats Hispanic/Latino as an ethnic category. This table excludes Latinos from the racial categories and assigns them to a separate category. Hispanics/Latinos may be of any race.
Race / Ethnicity (NH = Non-Hispanic)	Pop 2000	Pop 2010	Pop 2020	% 2000	% 2010	% 2020
White alone (NH)	4,558	3,200	2,272	18.04%	12.63%	8.91%
Black or African American alone (NH)	19,721	20,317	20,502	78.04%	80.20%	80.37%
Native American or Alaska Native alone (NH)	65	66	58	0.26%	0.26%	0.23%
Asian alone (NH)	200	315	360	0.79%	1.24%	1.41%
Native Hawaiian or Pacific Islander alone (NH)	7	7	3	0.03%	0.03%	0.01%
Other race alone (NH)	17	65	139	0.07%	0.26%	0.54%
Mixed race or Multiracial (NH)	323	463	789	1.28%	1.83%	3.09%
Hispanic or Latino (any race)	378	900	1,388	1.50%	3.55%	5.44%
Total	25,269	25,333	25,511	100.00%	100.00%	100.00%

=== 2020 census ===
As of the 2020 census, Lochearn had a population of 25,511. The median age was 43.3 years. 20.3% of residents were under the age of 18 and 21.4% of residents were 65 years of age or older. For every 100 females there were 83.5 males, and for every 100 females age 18 and over there were 78.9 males age 18 and over.

100.0% of residents lived in urban areas, while 0.0% lived in rural areas.

There were 10,079 households in Lochearn, of which 28.4% had children under the age of 18 living in them. Of all households, 35.2% were married-couple households, 18.8% were households with a male householder and no spouse or partner present, and 41.1% were households with a female householder and no spouse or partner present. About 29.7% of all households were made up of individuals and 13.3% had someone living alone who was 65 years of age or older.

There were 10,633 housing units, of which 5.2% were vacant. The homeowner vacancy rate was 2.1% and the rental vacancy rate was 6.5%.

Racial composition as of the 2020 census
Race	Number	Percent
White	2,407	9.4%
Black or African American	20,634	80.9%
American Indian and Alaska Native	89	0.3%
Asian	372	1.5%
Native Hawaiian and Other Pacific Islander	5	0.0%
Some other race	853	3.3%
Two or more races	1,151	4.5%
Hispanic or Latino (of any race)	1,388	5.4%

=== 2000 census ===
At the 2000 census there were 25,269 people, 9,771 households, and 6,732 families in the CDP. The population density was 4,537.1 inhabitants per square mile (1,751.8/km^{2}). There were 10,229 housing units at an average density of 1,836.6 per square mile (709.1/km^{2}). The racial makeup of the CDP was 18.50% White, 78.40% African American, 0.30% Native American, 0.81% Asian, 0.04% Pacific Islander, 0.49% from other races, and 1.46% from two or more races. Hispanic or Latino of any race were 1.50%. 5% of Lochearn's residents were German, 4% Irish, 3% West Indian, 2% Sub-Saharan African, 2% English, 2% Jamaican, and 2% African.

Of the 9,771 households 29.6% had children under the age of 18 living with them, 42.9% were married couples living together, 21.1% had a female householder with no husband present, and 31.1% were non-families. 26.4% of households were one person and 8.1% were one person aged 65 or older. The average household size was 2.55 and the average family size was 3.06.

The age distribution was 25.1% under the age of 18, 7.8% from 18 to 24, 27.2% from 25 to 44, 26.1% from 45 to 64, and 13.7% 65 or older. The median age was 38 years. For every 100 females, there were 84.4 males. For every 100 females age 18 and over, there were 78.9 males.

The median household income was $49,517 and the median family income was $54,994. Males had a median income of $35,459 versus $30,339 for females. The per capita income for the CDP was $21,652. About 4.7% of families and 7.0% of the population were below the poverty line, including 9.3% of those under age 18 and 7.3% of those age 65 or over.

== Notable native ==
- Kevin B. Kamenetz, 11th County Executive of Baltimore County (2010–2018) and County Councilman (1994–2010).
