= Kenneth Oliver =

American politician (1945–2024)

Member of the Baltimore County Council from the 4th district
- In office December 2002 – December 1, 2014
- Preceded by: Wayne M. Skinner
- Succeeded by: Julian E. Jones Jr.

Personal details
- Born: 1945 Montgomery, Alabama, U.S.
- Died: November 11, 2024 (aged 79)
- Party: Democratic
- Children: 3
- Education: University of Baltimore (BS); Morgan State University (MBA)

Kenneth N. Oliver (1945 – November 11, 2024) was an American politician who was a member of the Baltimore County Council from the fourth district from 2002 to 2014. He was the first African-American member of the Baltimore County Council.

== Early life and education ==
Oliver was born in Montgomery, Alabama, in 1945. After graduating from Baltimore City public schools, he attended the University of Baltimore, where he earned a Bachelor of Science degree in business administration, and Morgan State University, where he earned a Master of Business Administration degree. Oliver eventually became an assistant professor at Coppin State College.

== Personal life and death ==
In July, 2009, Oliver pleaded guilty to two theft charges related to campaign finance.

Oliver died on November 11, 2024, at the age of 79.
