= Honeygo, Maryland =

Honeygo
- Census-designated place
- Location within the state of Maryland Honeygo (the United States)
- Coordinates: 39.404°N 76.444°W
- Country: United States of America
- State: Maryland
- County: Baltimore

Area
  - Total: 5.85 sq mi (15.16 km^{2})
  - Land: 5.85 sq mi (15.15 km^{2})
  - Water: 0.0039 sq mi (0.01 km^{2})

Population (2020)
  - Total: 12,927
  - Density: 2,209.5/sq mi (853.09/km^{2})
- Time zone: UTC-5 (Eastern (EST))
  - Summer (DST): UTC-4 (EDT)
- FIPS code: 24-40200

Honeygo is a census designated place in Baltimore County, Maryland, United States. It first appeared as a CDP in the 2020 Census with a population of 12,927.

== Demographics ==
Historical population
Census	Pop.	Note	%±
2020	12,927		—
U.S. Decennial Census; 2020

Honeygo first appeared as a census designated place in the 2020 census.

=== 2020 census ===
As of the 2020 census, Honeygo had a population of 12,927. The median age was 42.2 years. 25.5% of residents were under the age of 18 and 17.3% of residents were 65 years of age or older. For every 100 females there were 90.2 males, and for every 100 females age 18 and over there were 88.0 males age 18 and over.

99.7% of residents lived in urban areas, while 0.3% lived in rural areas.

There were 4,409 households in Honeygo, of which 39.9% had children under the age of 18 living in them. Of all households, 62.6% were married-couple households, 10.4% were households with a male householder and no spouse or partner present, and 23.3% were households with a female householder and no spouse or partner present. About 21.6% of all households were made up of individuals and 13.0% had someone living alone who was 65 years of age or older.

There were 4,533 housing units, of which 2.7% were vacant. The homeowner vacancy rate was 0.8% and the rental vacancy rate was 8.5%.

Honeygo CDP, Maryland – Racial and ethnic composition Note: the US Census treats Hispanic/Latino as an ethnic category. This table excludes Latinos from the racial categories and assigns them to a separate category. Hispanics/Latinos may be of any race.
Race / Ethnicity (NH = Non-Hispanic)	Pop 2020	% 2020
White alone (NH)	8,296	64.18%
Black or African American alone (NH)	1,463	11.32%
Native American or Alaska Native alone (NH)	17	0.13%
Asian alone (NH)	2,107	16.30%
Native Hawaiian or Pacific Islander alone (NH)	0	0.00%
Other race alone (NH)	45	0.35%
Mixed race or Multiracial (NH)	550	4.25%
Hispanic or Latino (any race)	449	3.47%
Total	12,927	100.00%
