= Baltimore County Circuit Courthouses =

- Baltimore County Courthouse
- U.S. National Register of Historic Places
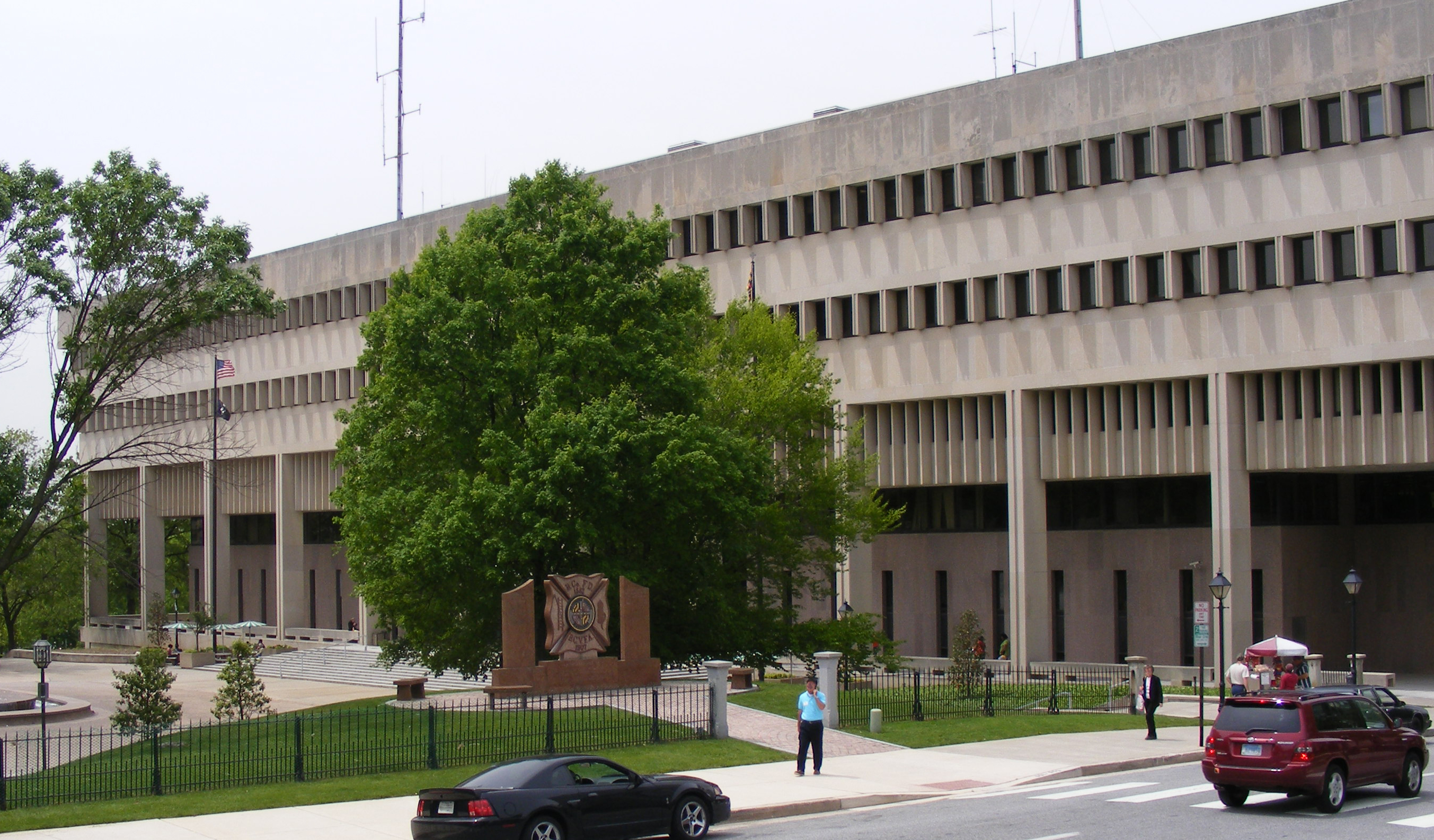

- Location within Maryland Location within the United States
- Location: Washington Avenue between Pennsylvania and Chesapeake Avenues, in Towson, Maryland
- Coordinates: 39°23′59″N 76°36′24″W
- Area: 4 acres (1.6 ha)
- Built: 1855 (additions: 1910, 1925, 1958)
- Architect: Dixon, Bilbirnie & Dixon; E.F. Baldwin, Josias Pennington, Baldwin & Pennington
- Architectural style: Greek Revival
- NRHP reference No.: 72000569
- Added to NRHP: October 27, 1972

The Baltimore County Courthouses are located in Towson, Maryland, the county seat of Baltimore County, Maryland, United States. The older, original Baltimore County Courthouse was built between 1854 and 1856. It has had three additions that eventually formed an 'H' shape. It houses many of the offices of the county government, including the executive branch, county executive, and their departments, agencies, boards, commissions, and other bodies, and the county council.

The County Courts Building, known as the new courthouse, lies to the west, separated by a plaza. Built between 1970 and 1971, it houses the civil, criminal, family and juvenile divisions of the 3rd Judicial Circuit of the Circuit Courts of Maryland, and the Baltimore County Sheriff's Office, which is charged with the protection of the courthouse and its judicial personnel and countywide law enforcement functions.

== First courthouse ==
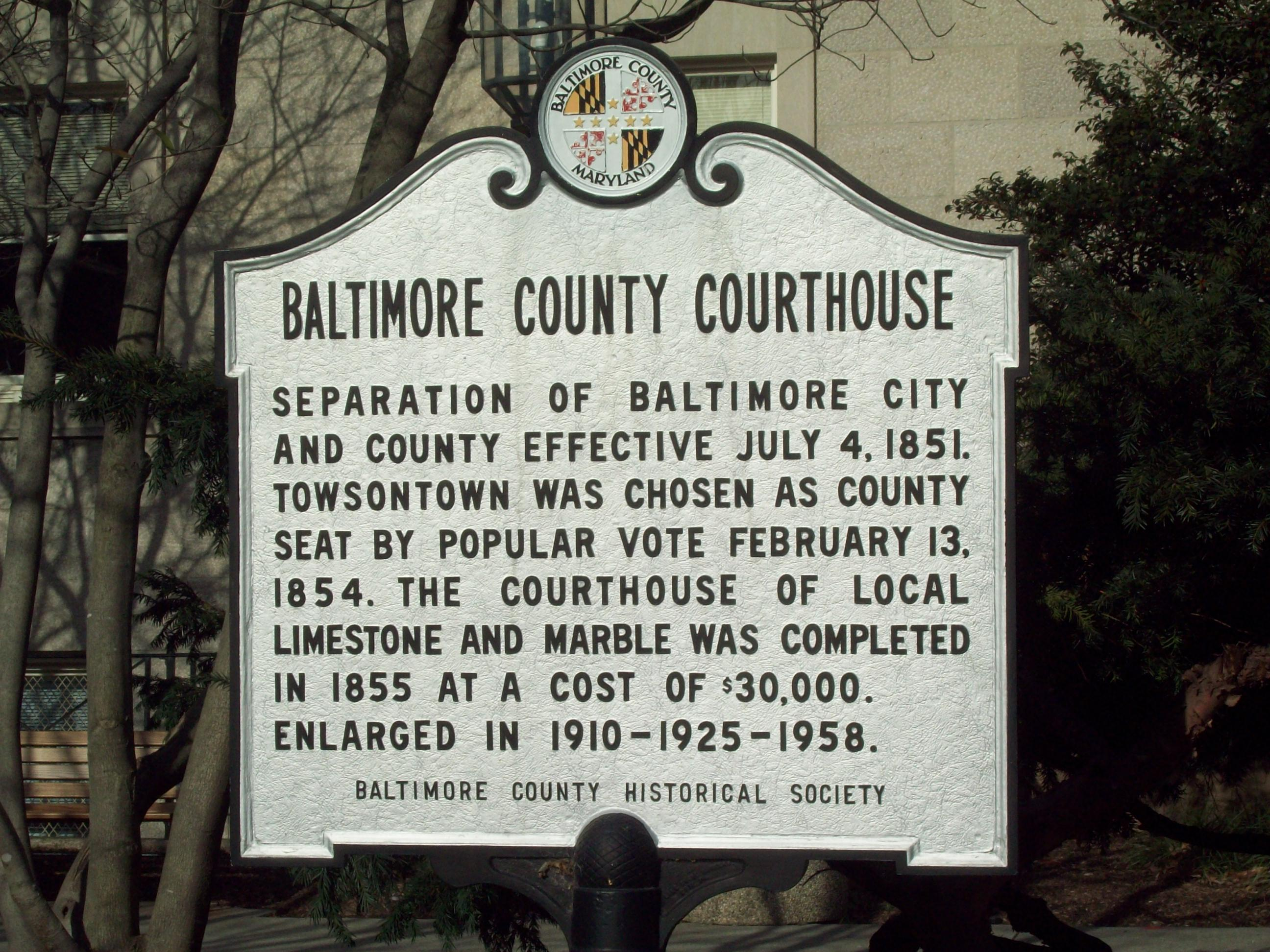
A Maryland state historical marker outside the historic 1855-1856 façade of the Baltimore County Courthouse on Washington Avenue, in Towson, Maryland

Originally constructed in 1854–55, at a cost then of thirty thousand dollars ($30,000), the building is one of the few H-plan buildings, public or private, remaining in the State. All of the original exterior treatments are preserved intact.

The Towsontown Courthouse was founded in 1854. It replaced the earlier city and county courthouses that had been shared since 1768 by both Baltimore Town (and later City) and the surrounding County. The first one was located in old "Courthouse Square", now in downtown. Construction began in the port town of Baltimore in 1768, a year after it was newly designated as the county seat. This had formerly been at old Joppa, a village near the mouth of the Gunpowder River at Chesapeake Bay along the mid-eastern boundaries of the County. Without the court functions, the village declined. Baltimore is located on the Northwest Branch of the Patapsco River and had been founded in 1730.

The old Courthouse Square had always been a gathering place for news, gossip and protests, along with mass meetings and assemblies of the citizenry. It became the site of a memorial for the soldiers and officers in the Battle of North Point with the British Army, which took place southeast of the city on the Patapsco Neck, as well as honoring those in the bombardment at Fort McHenry during the recent Battle of Baltimore. It was renamed as Battle Monument Square. The second courthouse was built during 1815 to 1822, and its east side faced this square. the east side of the second courthouse faced the new adjoining

Across from the city and county courthouse was the Battle Monument which replaced the previous first County and Town Courts, later known as the "Courthouse on Stilts" as the 1768 building was temporarily saved from razing when it became necessary to extend Calvert Street further north, so later in 1784, local town builder Leonard Harbaugh erected a new brick/stone foundation under the building resting on arches supporting the building and cut away ground around it enabling the street passage beneath, in the Square at the edge of the cliffs then overlooking the bend of the Jones Falls flowing south to the harbor. The first courthouse in the square was razed around 1804-1805. It was also here on July 29, 1776, that the recently adopted Declaration of Independence proclaimed three weeks earlier by the Second Continental Congress at the old Pennsylvania State House (now renamed Independence Hall) in Philadelphia, was read to the townfolk along the Patapsco River.

The historic Baltimore County Courthouse is an edifice of limestone and marble, two stories in height and nine bays in length, surrounded by a modest park and square on the east (and north/south) sides; this is landscaped with a variety of flowers and shrubs and small trees, with winding paths and benches. Several small memorials and historical objects are displayed.

== Second courthouse ==
=== 18th century ===
A second city and county courthouse was constructed in 1768 across the street from the old public square in downtown Baltimore. It is to the west at the northwestern corner facing East Lexington Street and North Calvert Street. For several years, it faced the empty square of the recently razed earlier colonial-era courthouse. This center city site was considered for the proposed first monument to honor George Washington, commanding General of the Continental Army in the American Revolutionary War and first President of the United States.

=== 19th century ===
The town lay a cornerstone for the new planned Washington column on Independence Day, July 4, 1814, 15 years after the president's death and during the War of 1812. This was a few months before the massive military attack by British sea and land forces later that September, when they burned the United States Capitol in Washington, D.C. Local home owners feared that the unusually tall column proposed might threaten their houses, and the proposed Washington memorial was moved north of the town to "Howard's Woods" on land donated by Col. John Eager Howard, to the west of his mansion on his estate of "Belvidere". It is now at the center of Baltimore's Washington Square.

The east original facade of 1855-1856 is of Greek Revival-styled architecture, with a portico/porte-cochère that has a pediment supported by fluted Doric columns. The structure is one hundred and twelve feet in length in front, by fifty-six feet in depth. A shallow A-frame roof of the main block is crowned with a centered, eight-windowed, pilastered, frame cupola bearing a domed copper roof.

The second courthouse of Georgian style was constructed on the southwest corner of then North Calvert and East Lexington streets, opposite the old "Courthouse Square" in which the Battle Monument, which was designed by French architect Maximilian Godefroy, was located.

==== Star-Spangled Banner ====
The Battle Monument commemorated Defenders' Day, a city, county, and state official holiday of the British attack on Baltimore. The "rockets red glare, the bombs bursting in air" were lines of a poem initially titled "The Defence of Fort McHenry", which soon appeared on printed broadsheets and handbills from the offices of the Baltimore American around town and was soon published in the Baltimore Patriot.

It was written by poet and lawyer Francis Scott Key, of Frederick and Georgetown, who witnessed the bombardment of Fort McHenry from the truce ship Minden anchored downriver on the Patapsco River, probably off Sparrows Point on the north side near the river entrance or the Royal Navy's invasion fleet's landing site at North Point. Key had been invited by officials and neighbors to try to negotiate the release of William Beanes, a physician from Prince George's County, who was captured by the British. Key's poem was set to music in a few days at a local Baltimore theatre and neighboring tavern on Holliday Street, and quickly became known as the "Star-Spangled Banner." In 1931, the song was designated by the U.S. Congress as the national anthem.

==== Maryland Constitution ====
After debates and votes, the new second Maryland Constitution of 1851 was adopted, including provisions for elevating the city of Baltimore to the status of an independent city on the same status of all of the other counties of the state and increasing its representation and number of votes and members in each chamber of the state legislature, in the House of Delegates and the State Senate in the General Assembly of Maryland.

With the positive vote, Baltimore, which had functioned as the county seat of Baltimore County since 1767, an 84-year tenure was separated and established as an "independent city" with the status of one of 23 counties of Maryland as of July 4, 1851. A subsequent series of votes and referendums by the citizens of the remaining reduced territory of new Baltimore County, voted to move the new county seat to what was then called then "Towsontown", as of February 13, 1854.

Named for the Towson family of early colonial settlers, brothers William and Thomas Towson, who moved to the area from Pennsylvania in the early 1750s, their homestead was located near the current traffic circle at Joppa at York and Dulaney Valley Roads, where they began farming at Sater's Hill, just to the northeast. Thomas' son, Ezekiel, later built a log tavern where present-day Recher Theatre is based.

Ezekiel's tavern soon became a regular stopping place for travelers and farmers heading north out of the city or south with their crops towards Baltimore, beginning the small cross-roads community's place as a commercial place for doing business. Several hundred yards to the northwest at the current 617 York Road, is the wood-frame house of Solomon Schmuck, now a bridal boutique store, which is said by local historians to be Towson's oldest house.

He married Catharine Towson, one of hotelier Ezekiel's 12 children, and granddaughter to Thomas, uniting the Schmuck and Towson families. Ezekiel became a leader in the county and its support for the American Revolution.

Catherine Townson's carved tombstone, the last upright stone remaining in a small family plot, surrounded by several other unmarked relatives' graves, including the connected Shealey family, was recently surrounded in 2014 by the construction of the Towson Square shopping and entertainment development, a four-acre project costing $85 million. Also buried in the plot is General Nathan Towson, a veteran of the War of 1812 whose reputation increased the profile of the small town in the early 19th century.

The cornerstone of the new County Courthouse was laid with elaborate ceremonies and a procession, on October 19, 1854, in front of a numerous assemblage in what was still then known as "Towsontown". Coleman Yellott, a local attorney, delivered the official address and oratory for the occasion, saying:

The ceremony which you had assembled to witness, has now been performed. The Corner Stone of the building has been laid; and soon the edifice itself will rise towards the Heavens, attracting, by the beauty of its proportions and the simple grandeur of its walls, the admiring gaze of every traveler along yonder highway. May it stand for ages, in sunshine and in storm, firm and unshaken as the hill in which its foundations are planted; and may it ever be pointed to as a temple of Justice!"

Designed by local city architects of Dixon, Bilbirnie & Dixon and Baldwin & Pennington, which included Ephraim Francis Baldwin and Josias Pennington. The building was completed in 1855 by the builder, William H. Allen, but the first session of the Court was not held until two years later, on January 5, 1857, after a long battle about the land title for the site from Grafton M. Bosley, who owned a large portion of the western side of the town and presented it to the county with a "right-of-way" to it from the Baltimore and York Turnpike. It was finally resolved from the nearby turnpike company in December 1856.

On May 15, 1857, the new courthouse and the jail, which is two blocks south, were declared finished and formally handed over to the county commissioners. Six years later, the building was the object of an arson attack. According to The New York Times, on August 14, 1861, the building was "fired by incendiary". The articles reports that the fire was contained to the records office and the rest of the building escaped damage.

=== 20th century ===
The building was enlarged in 1910, again in 1925, and a third time in 1958. The building was listed on the National Register of Historic Places in 1972.

== County Courts Building ==
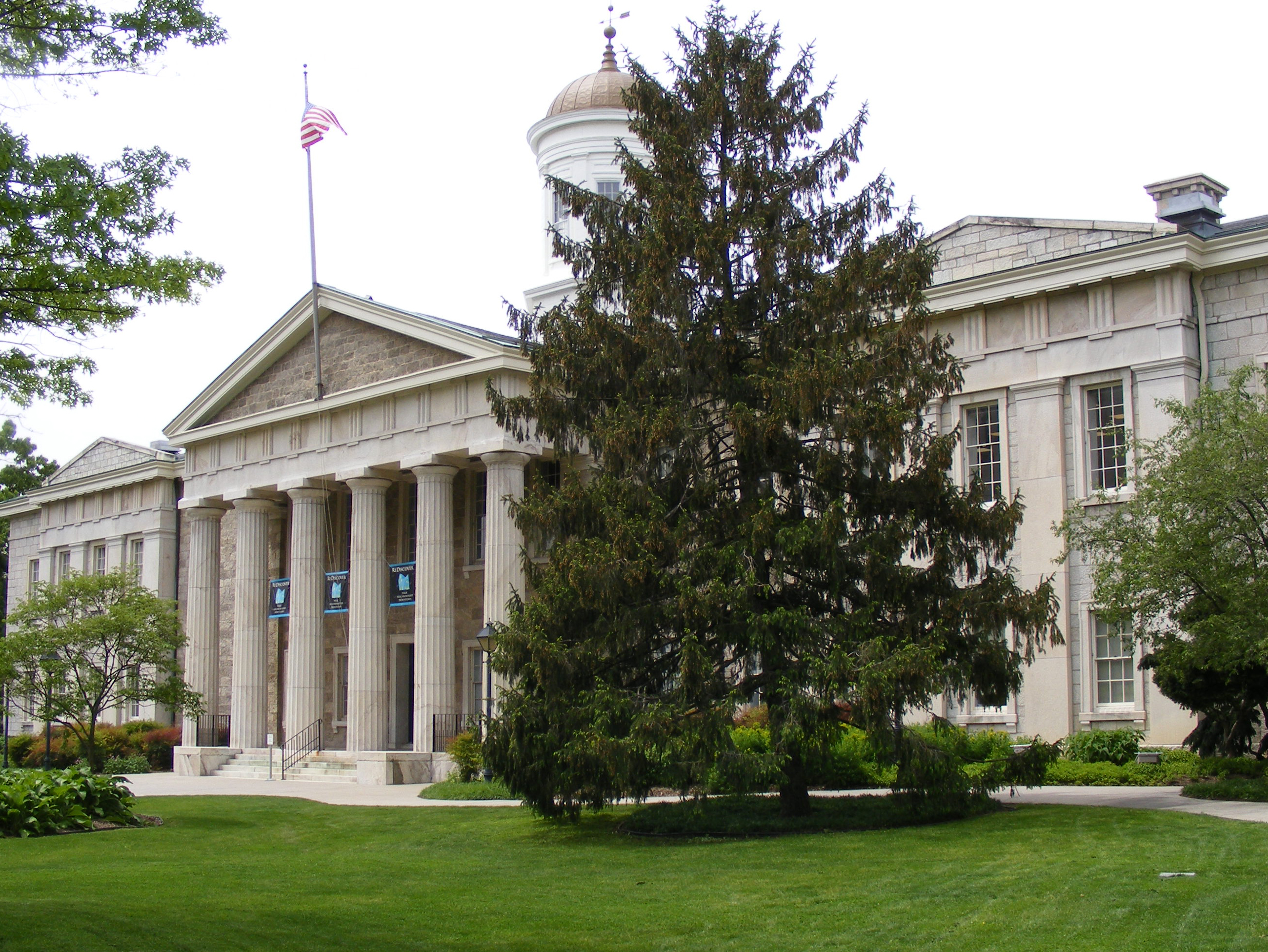
Historic Baltimore County Courthouse

The Baltimore County Courts Building is located on Bosley Avenue in Towson, Maryland. It faces the same public square as does the first, historic Baltimore County Courthouse. Sometimes referred to as the "New Courthouse" in the context of the two buildings, it was designed in the modernist style and constructed about 1970. It has white stone panels that match the older building.

It houses the 17 judges of the Circuit Court of Maryland for Baltimore County, the offices of the Baltimore County State's Attorney, juvenile and equity masters, four retired judges, and nearly 100 support personnel. Courtrooms, judges bailiffs, and staff for the District Courts of Maryland, dealing with lower-level legal matters, are located in several district courthouses in various sections of the county, to the east and the west.
