= Mays Chapel, Maryland =

- Census-designated place
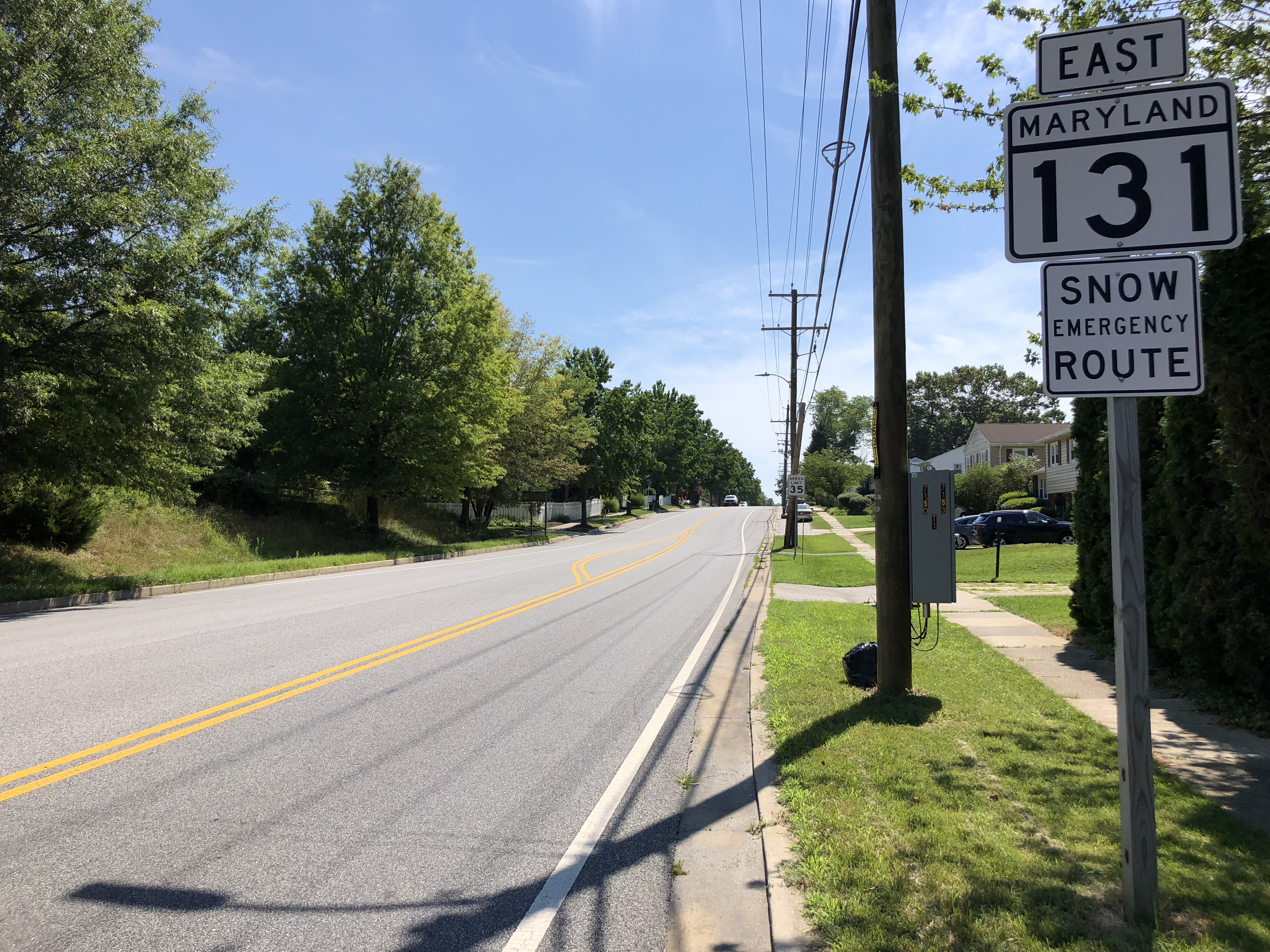
- West Seminary Avenue at Thornton Road in Mays Chapel, Maryland

- Location of Mays Chapel, Maryland
- Coordinates: 39°26′1″N 76°38′59″W
- Country: United States
- State: Maryland
- County: Baltimore

Area
  - Total: 3.71 sq mi (9.62 km^{2})
  - Land: 3.71 sq mi (9.61 km^{2})
  - Water: 0.0039 sq mi (0.01 km^{2})
- Elevation: 460 ft (140 m)

Population (2020)
  - Total: 12,224
  - Density: 3,295.4/sq mi (1,272.36/km^{2})
- Time zone: UTC−5 (Eastern (EST))
  - Summer (DST): UTC−4 (EDT)
- ZIP code: 21093
- Area codes: 410 and 443 and 667
- FIPS code: 24-51587
- GNIS feature ID: 1867295

Mays Chapel is an unincorporated community and census-designated place in Baltimore County, Maryland, United States. The population was 11,420 at the 2010 census.

== History ==
Mays Chapel Village was developed in the 1970s. The property was originally a large farm known as Mayfair, whose 1812 stone house remains overlooking Greenpoint Road near its intersection with Avebury Road. The land originally belonged to Thomas Cockey Deye, and it was the home of Frederick Price and Penelope Deye Owings Price. Penelope Price was later remarried, taking the surname Goodwin. The 1850 Baltimore County Atlas confirms Mrs. Goodwin's residency in the dwelling. Upon her death in 1875, the property passed to her heirs, first to Eliza Goodwin and then Charles E.R. Goodwin. In 1904, the property finally passed out of the family upon its conveyance to Fairfax S. Landstreet from then-owner Edward G. Cherbonnier. The original road leading from York Road was called Landstreet Road, and while this is now cut off by Interstate 83, the lot on which the 1812 house stands is still listed as being on Landstreet Road. The farmland was sold for development in the 1970s, and Mays Chapel Village was named for a nearby mid-19th century church.

== Geography ==
Mays Chapel is located at 39°26′1″N 76°38′59″W (39.433708, −76.649694), to the west of Timonium across Interstate 83.

According to the United States Census Bureau, the CDP has a total area of 3.8 square miles (9.8 km^{2}), all land.

== Demographics ==
Historical population
Census	Pop.	Note	%±
1980	5,213		—
1990	10,132		94.4%
2000	11,427		12.8%
2010	11,420		−0.1%
2020	12,224		7.0%

=== Racial and ethnic composition ===
Mays Chapel CDP, Maryland – Racial and ethnic composition Note: the US Census treats Hispanic/Latino as an ethnic category. This table excludes Latinos from the racial categories and assigns them to a separate category. Hispanics/Latinos may be of any race.
Race / Ethnicity (NH = Non-Hispanic)	Pop 2000	Pop 2010	Pop 2020	% 2000	% 2010	% 2020
White alone (NH)	10,277	9,636	9,265	89.94%	84.38%	75.79%
Black or African American alone (NH)	98	199	341	0.86%	1.74%	2.79%
Native American or Alaska Native alone (NH)	5	22	4	0.04%	0.19%	0.03%
Asian alone (NH)	793	1,151	1,693	6.94%	10.08%	13.85%
Native Hawaiian or Pacific Islander alone (NH)	1	8	3	0.01%	0.07%	0.02%
Other race alone (NH)	8	5	26	0.07%	0.04%	0.21%
Mixed race or Multiracial (NH)	94	126	437	0.82%	1.10%	3.57%
Hispanic or Latino (any race)	151	273	455	1.32%	2.39%	3.72%
Total	11,427	11,420	12,224	100.00%	100.00%	100.00%

=== 2020 census ===
As of the 2020 census, Mays Chapel had a population of 12,224.

The median age was 44.2 years. 22.4% of residents were under the age of 18 and 20.5% of residents were 65 years of age or older. For every 100 females there were 89.9 males, and for every 100 females age 18 and over there were 86.2 males age 18 and over.

100.0% of residents lived in urban areas, while 0.0% lived in rural areas.

There were 4,905 households in Mays Chapel, of which 32.1% had children under the age of 18 living in them. Of all households, 58.2% were married-couple households, 11.7% were households with a male householder and no spouse or partner present, and 26.7% were households with a female householder and no spouse or partner present. About 26.3% of all households were made up of individuals and 13.9% had someone living alone who was 65 years of age or older.

There were 5,071 housing units, of which 3.3% were vacant. The homeowner vacancy rate was 0.7% and the rental vacancy rate was 6.2%.

=== 2000 census ===
As of the census of 2000, there were 11,427 people, 4,675 households, and 3,225 families residing in the CDP. The population density was 3,045.4 inhabitants per square mile (1,175.8/km^{2}). There were 4,762 housing units at an average density of 1,269.1 per square mile (490.0/km^{2}). The racial makeup of the CDP was 90.85% White, 0.86% African American, 0.04% Native American, 6.96% Asian, 0.01% Pacific Islander, 0.40% from other races, and 0.88% from two or more races. Hispanic or Latino of any race were 1.32% of the population.

There were 4,675 households, out of which 32.2% had children under the age of 18 living with them, 59.5% were married couples living together, 7.4% had a female householder with no husband present, and 31.0% were non-families. 26.4% of all households were made up of individuals, and 9.2% had someone living alone who was 65 years of age or older. The average household size was 2.44 and the average family size was 2.99.

In the CDP, the population was spread out, with 25.2% under the age of 18, 3.8% from 18 to 24, 27.8% from 25 to 44, 28.3% from 45 to 64, and 15.0% who were 65 years of age or older. The median age was 42 years. For every 100 females, there were 86.5 males. For every 100 females age 18 and over, there were 83.1 males.

The median income for a household in the CDP was $71,786, and the median income for a family was $84,549. Males had a median income of $61,841 versus $45,036 for females. The per capita income for the CDP was $41,086. About 2.0% of families and 2.4% of the population were below the poverty line, including 1.8% of those under age 18 and 3.4% of those age 65 or over.
