= Louis S. Diggs =

American writer and historian (1932–2022)

Louis S. Diggs (April 13, 1932 – October 24, 2022) was an African-American writer and historian specializing in the African-American history of Baltimore County, Maryland. As a chronicler of the county's African-American legacy, his work illuminates the historic past of its Black communities. In addition to social history, Diggs has published on Baltimore African-American military records from the American Civil War and the Maryland Army National Guard. Diggs died on October 24, 2022, at the age of 90.

== Military career ==
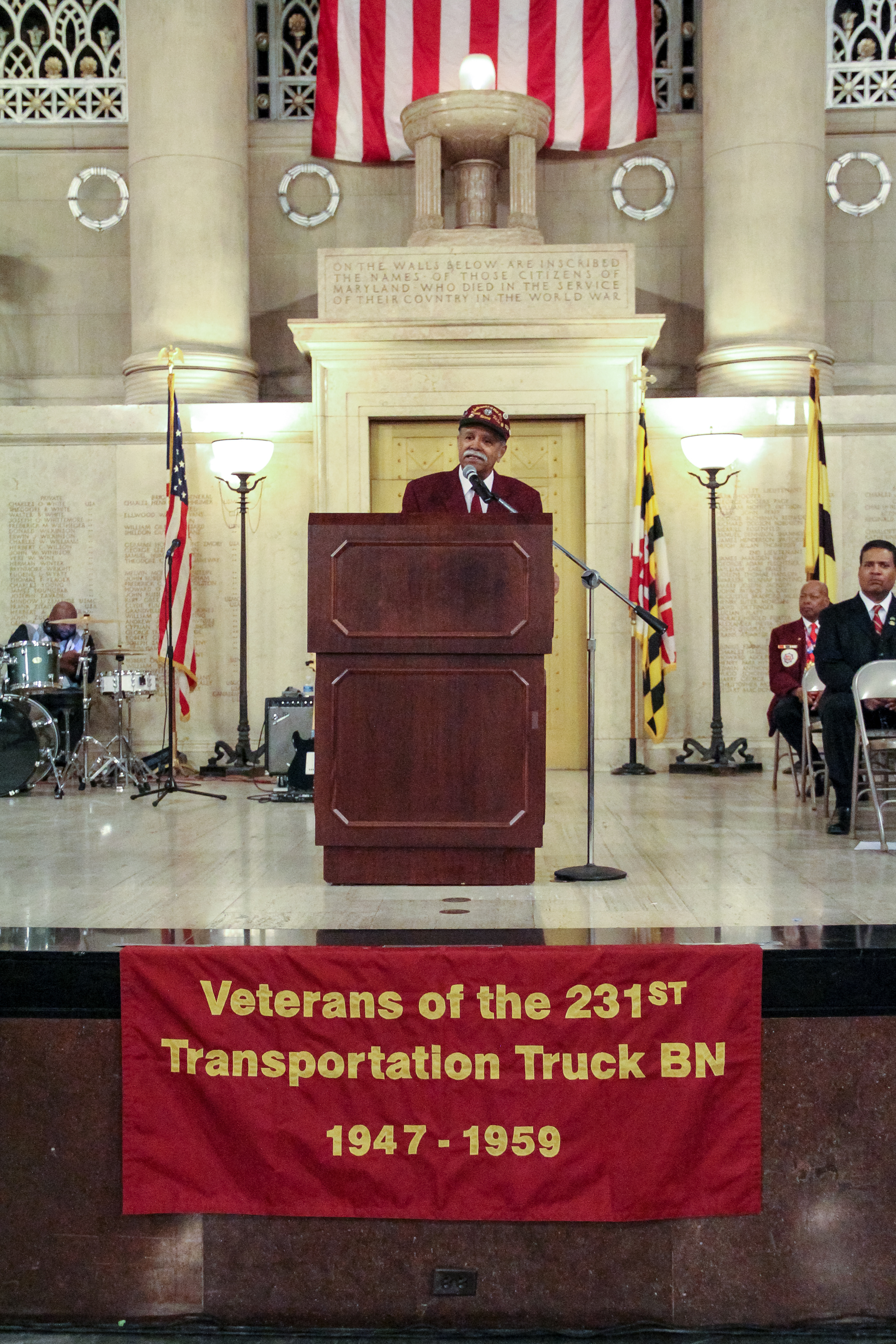
Diggs at the 2014 ceremony celebrating the 231st Transportation Truck Battalion's 135th anniversary of its establishment as an all-Black independent militia company

In 1950, Diggs dropped out of Douglas High School for two years of service in Korea as a member of the all Black Maryland National Guard (726th Transportation Truck Company of the 231st Transportation Truck Battalion). After tours in Korea, Germany, and Japan, he retired from the military in 1970.

== Education ==
Diggs earned his high school diploma in 1975 and an AA degree from Catonsville Community College (1976). Subsequently, the University of Baltimore awarded him a BA degree cum laude (1979) and Masters of Public Administration (1982).

== Later career ==
Diggs followed up his military career with nineteen years in the DC public school system from which he retired in 1989. However, it was his subsequent work as a substitute teacher at Catonsville High School that inspired his third career as an historian and chronicler of Baltimore County's African-American communities when he discovered that his students had little knowledge of the historic background of their own community. He then researched and wrote his first book: It All Started on Winter's Lane. Nine more books followed.

== Honors and tributes ==
- Diggs was honored by the State of Maryland in 1997 for his contributions in preserving the history of Maryland's Black communities.
- The Diggs/Johnson (Louis S. Diggs - Lenwood Johnson ) Mini-Museum on African American History was opened on November 14, 2015. Named in honor of Louis Diggs and Lenwood Johnson, the museum is located in the former Cherry Hill African Union Methodist Protestant Church in Granite, Maryland. The church building, whose origins date to the 1880s and which was abandoned after the last congregation left during the 1970s, was restored through state funding and community support under Digg's leadership.
- In 2016, Baltimore County established the Louis S. Diggs Award in honor of his work preserving African American History in Baltimore County. The award is given annually during Black History Month.

== Publications ==
- It all started on Winters Lane: A History of the Black Community in Catonsville, Maryland, Linda D. Stone, editor. Uptown Press, Baltimore, MD, 1995. ISBN 978-097957050-6
- Holding on to Their Heritage, Francis Martin Cockey, editor. Uptown Press, Baltimore, MD, 1996. ISBN 0-9663419-8-8
- In Our Voices: A Folk History in Legacy, Ann V. Augustine, editor. Uptown Press, Baltimore, MD, 1998. ISBN 978-097957051-3
- Since the Beginning: African-American communities in Towson, Uptown Press, Baltimore, MD, 2000. ISBN 0-9663419-5-3.
- Surviving in America: Histories of 7 Black communities in Baltimore County, Maryland: Oakland Park Road, Relay, Oella, Halethorpe, Granite, Church Lane, Winands Road, With Evangeline A. Wheeler. Uptown Press, Baltimore, MD, 2002. ISBN 0-9663419-6-1.
- From the Meadows to the Point: The Histories of the African-American community of Turner Station, Evangeline A. Wheeler editor. Uptown Press, Baltimore, MD, 2003. ISBN 0-9663419-1-0.
- North County: The History of African-American Settlements in Northern Baltimore County's Scenic Horse Country, Shirley Washington Diggs, editor, Uptown Press, Baltimore, MD, 2005.
- Our Struggles: Historic African-American Communities in Southeast Baltimore County, Maryland: Overlea, Back River Neck Road, Goodwood/Hyde Park, Hopewell Avenue, Norris Lane, Edgemere Uptown Press, Baltimore, MD, 2007. ISBN 978-097957053-7.
- Forgotten Road Warriors: The History of an all African-American Maryland National Guard Unit from Baltimore, Maryland, Uptown Press, Baltimore, MD, 2005. ISBN 0-9663419-4-5.
- African-Americans from Baltimore County who served in the Civil War, Maryland's Six Regiments of Slaves, Shirley C. Diggs, editor, Baltimore, MD, 2014. ISBN 978-1935911166
