= Baltimore County Sheriff's Office =

- Patch of the Baltimore County Sheriff's Office
- Abbreviation: BCoSO

Agency overview
- Formed: 1659; 367 years ago
- Employees: 70

Jurisdictional structure
- Operations jurisdiction: Baltimore County, Maryland, United States
- Map of Baltimore County Sheriff's Office's jurisdiction
- Area: 682 mi^{2} (1,770 km^{2})
- Population: 805,029
- Legal jurisdiction: Baltimore County, Maryland

Operational structure
- Headquarters: Baltimore County Circuit Courthouses, Towson, Maryland
- Deputies: 70
- Agency executive: R. Jay Fisher, Sheriff

Website
- Baltimore County Sheriff's Office Website

The Baltimore County Sheriff's Office (BCoSO) is a Sheriff's Office in Baltimore County, Maryland, US, and the secondary law enforcement agency of the county (after the Baltimore County Police Department) which provides protection for the Baltimore County Courthouse in Towson, Maryland. The Baltimore County Sheriff's Office is one of the oldest sheriff's offices in existence in the State of Maryland, dating back to 1659, the year of the county's founding.

== Authority ==
The authority of the Sheriff and all sworn deputies are constitutional in origin. All are certified police officers with full arrest authority under guidelines of the Maryland Police and Correctional Training Commission and the Constitution of the State of Maryland.

== Organization ==
As of 2008, the BCoSO is headed by R. Jay Fisher, Sheriff of Baltimore County. The BCoSO currently has an authorized complement of 70 sworn deputies. The rank structure is as follows:

- Sheriff (1)
- Undersheriff (1)
- Captain (1)
- Lieutenant (2)
- Sergeant (6)
- Deputy & Deputy First Class (60)

The BCoSO is subdivided into five sections as follows:

- Courtroom Security Bureau and Transportation Division - responsible for transport and temporary housing of defendants to and from the Circuit Court, and other detention facilities.
- Field Operations Bureau - Legal Process Division; is responsible for the service of court-ordered processes such as Writs of Execution, Writs of Summons/Subpoenas, Writs of Possession (evictions), Ex Parte/Protective/Peace Orders, and service of Criminal/Juvenile/Civil Warrants.
- Field Operations Bureau - Warrant Unit; has the responsibility of non-support warrant service.
- Administrative Services Division - is responsible for the day-to-day operations of the BCoSO
- Security Division - is responsible for the constant security of the courthouse and surrounding property and is staffed by both sworn deputies and non-sworn security personnel.

=== List of sheriffs ===
Source: Maryland Manual On-Line

Sheriffs Under the constitution of 1776
Term	Name
1777	William Aisquith (resigned)
1777-1778	Henry Stephenson
1778-1779	Edward Cockey
1779-1780	Joseph Baxter
1780-1782	Job Garritson
1782	William McLaughlin
1782-1785	Edmund Ford
1785-1788	Philip Graybill [Graybell]
1788	William Gibson
1788-1791	Thomas Rutter Jr.
1791-1794	Robert Gorsuch
1794-1797	Henry Stephenson
1797-1800	Cornelius H. Gist
1800-1803	James Wilson
1803-1806	Thomas Bailey
1806-1809	John Hunter
1809-1812	William Merryman
1812-1813	John Hutchins (died in office)
1813-1815	John Chalmers
1815-1818	Matthew Murray
1818-1821	John Stevenson
1821-1824	Sheppard C. Leakin
1824-1827	Standish Barry
1827-1830	William Bale
1830-1833	Henry Green
1833-1836	Henry S. Sanderson
1839-1839	John W. Walker
1839-1842	William D. Ball
1842-1845	Nicholas Tracy
1845-1848	John Kettlewell
1848-1851	Joshua F. Hynes

Sheriffs Under the constitution of 1851
Term	Name
1851-1853	Samuel P. Storm
1853-1855	Pleasant Hunter
1855-1857	William Pole
1857-1859	Richard W. Hook
1859-1861	Francis J. Wheeler
1861-1863	Joseph Walker
1863-1864	Daniel S. Armstrong (died Nov. 9, 1864)
1864-1865	James Thompson

Sheriffs Under the constitution of 1864
Term	Name
1865-1867	John K. Harvey

Sheriffs Under the Constitution of 1867
Term	Name
1867-1869	Thomas Baldwin
1869-1871	Nicholas Burke
1871-1873	Samuel J. Robinson
1873-1874	Samuel F. Butler
1874	Samuel W. Worthington
1875-1877	Stephen Barton
1877-1879	Samuel W. Worthington
1879-1881	William A. Slade
1881-1883	Richard C. Tracey
1883-1885	Joseph R. Knight
1885-1887	Silas V. Miller
1887-1889	Joshua Tracey
1889-1891	Charles J. Beckley
1891-1893	Thomas R. Jenifer
1893-1895	Charles H. Holmes
1895-1897	William P. Cole
1897-1899	Joshua T. Whittle
1899-1901	William H. Todd
1901-1903	William J. Oeligrath
1903-1905	James Rittenhouse
1905-1907	Jacob Elliott
1907-1909	Abram T. Street
1909-1911	James Rittenhouse
1911-1913	Michael J. Gaff
1913-1915	Leonard G. Quinlin
1915-1917	Samuel C. Mahle
1917-1919	Abram T. Street
1919-1921	Samuel C. Mahle
1921-1923	J. Carroll Ensor
1923-1926	Caleb C. Burton

Sheriffs elected under 1922 Amendment to the state constitution.
Term	Name
1926-1930	Samuel A. Brooks
1930-1934	Bremen A. Trail
1934-1938	T. J. Randolph Nicholas
1938-1942	William G. Lynch
1942-1946	Gilbert G. Miller

Sheriffs elected under 1946 Amendment to the state constitution.
Term	Name
1946–1950	Clarence E. Deitz
1950–1962	Gilbert G. Miller
1962–1966	Edward G. Mueller
1966–1973	Gilbert L. Deyle
1973–1974	Leonard M. Carpenter
1974–1984	Charles H. Hickey Jr.
1984–1986	Frank B. Wiers Jr.
1986-1990	J. Edward (Ned) Malone Sr.
1990–1998	Norman M. Pepersack Jr.
1998–2002	Anne K. Strasdauskas

== See also ==
- List of law enforcement agencies in Maryland
