= Trump, Maryland =

Unincorporated community in Maryland, United States

- Unincorporated community
- Location within Maryland Location within the United States
- Coordinates: 39°40′56″N 76°36′08″W
- Country: United States
- State: Maryland
- County: Baltimore
- Elevation: 705 ft (215 m)
- Time zone: UTC-5 (Eastern (EST))
  - Summer (DST): UTC-4 (EDT)
- Area codes: 410, 443, & 667
- GNIS feature ID: 593847

Trump is an unincorporated community in northern Baltimore County, Maryland, United States. It was named after a nineteenth century settler named Simeon O. Van Trump, who ran a grocery store at Old York Road near West Liberty Road.
