= Kevin Kamenetz =

American politician

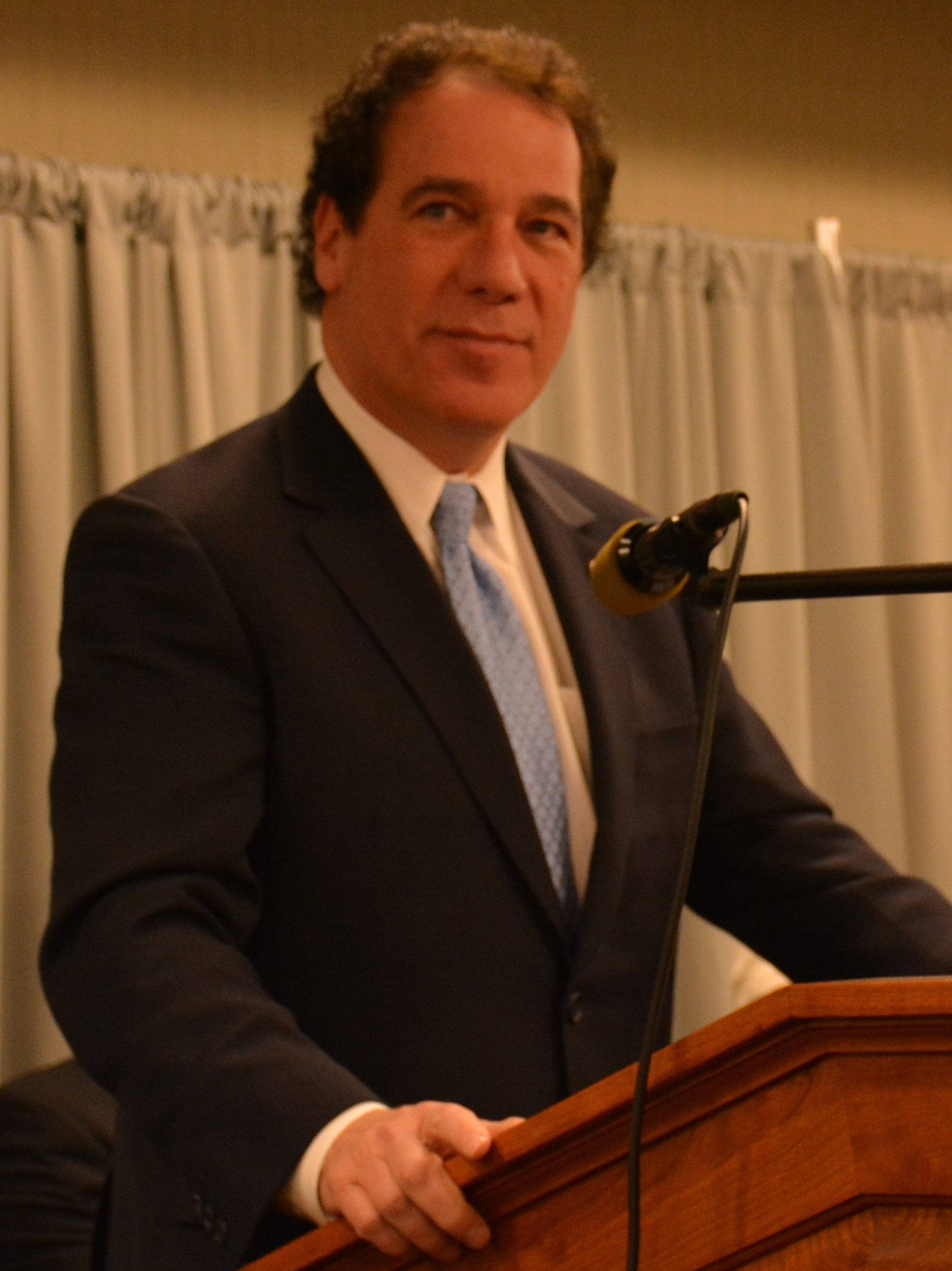

12th Executive of Baltimore County
- In office December 6, 2010 – May 10, 2018
- Preceded by: James T. Smith, Jr.
- Succeeded by: Fred Homan (Acting)

Member of the Baltimore County Council from the 2nd district
- In office 1994–2010
- Preceded by: Mel Mintz
- Succeeded by: Vicki Almond

Personal details
- Born: November 26, 1957 Lochearn, Maryland, U.S.
- Died: May 10, 2018 (aged 60) Towson, Maryland, U.S.
- Party: Democratic
- Spouse: Jill Kamenetz
- Children: 2
- Education: Johns Hopkins University (BA); University of Baltimore (JD)

Kevin B. Kamenetz (November 26, 1957 – May 10, 2018) was an American politician who was the 12th County Executive of Baltimore County, Maryland, serving between 2010 and May 10, 2018, when he died suddenly while in office. He was a member of the Democratic Party. He previously served as a four-term County Councilman representing the Second District of Baltimore County. On September 18, 2017, Kamenetz declared his candidacy for the Democratic nomination for the 2018 Maryland Gubernatorial Election.

== Early life, education, and career ==
Kamenetz was born on November 26, 1957, in Lochearn, Maryland, to Miriam and Irvin Kamenetz, a pharmacist who owned an Overlea pharmacy. He attended and graduated from the Gilman School, a private preparatory school for boys. He earned a bachelor's degree from the Johns Hopkins University in 1979, he graduated from University of Baltimore School of Law with a Juris Doctor in 1982, and he passed the Maryland Bar that same year.

Kamenetz worked as a prosecutor in the Office of the State's Attorney for Baltimore City from 1982 to 1987, and practiced law for over 30 years.

He was admitted to practice before the Bars of the United States District Court for the District of Maryland, the U.S. Court of Appeals for the Fourth Circuit, and the Supreme Court of the United States.

== Political career ==
Kamenetz was elected to the Democratic State Central Committee for terms in 1982, 1990, 1994, and served as Baltimore County Chair from 1993 to 1994.

=== Baltimore County Council ===
Kamenetz was elected to the Baltimore County Council in 1994 and was re-elected in 1998, 2002, and 2006, serving a total of 16 years. His fellow members of the Council elected him Chairman in 1996, 1999, 2003, and 2008. He served as Chair of the Council's Spending and Affordability Committee.

=== Baltimore County Executive ===
On November 2, 2010, Kamenetz was elected as the 12th Baltimore County Executive, succeeding James T. Smith, Jr.

Baltimore County launched its landmark "Schools for Our Future" program, a $1.3 billion ten-year school construction and renovation initiative designed to meet the needs of Baltimore County’s educational facilities by eliminating existing and projected overcrowding, modernizing learning environments, and improving safety. Through the program, Baltimore County is building 16 new schools and performing 19 major additions and renovations, reducing the number of Baltimore County Public Schools without central air conditioning from 90 in 2010 to 13 in 2017.

In December 2012, he had proposed building a new fire station in Towson Manor Park, a pocket park that represented the only green space in the Towson Manor Village neighborhood. The then-existing fire station in Towson was old and located in a site that could possibly be redeveloped for commercial purposes. The property was ultimately sold, and the proceeds used to pay for the new fire station. But the county was able to find space on underused land it already held in downtown Towson, leaving Towson Manor Park untouched. Three Baltimore County Schools and a police station, all on the county's east side, were also affected by similar land sales to developers.

In 2016, Kamenetz was elected President of the Maryland Association of Counties, a nonpartisan nonprofit organization that serves Maryland’s counties by articulating the needs of local government to the Maryland General Assembly. Maryland Association of Counties is the only organization serving the needs of county elected officials and governments across Maryland.

He served on the board of the Baltimore Metropolitan Council (Chair, 2012), the Baltimore Regional Transportation Board (Chair, 2013), the Board of Visitors, and the R Adams Cowley Shock Trauma Center.

=== 2018 Maryland gubernatorial election campaign ===
On September 18, 2017, Kamenetz announced his candidacy for Governor of Maryland in the 2018 election, running against incumbent Larry Hogan.

== Personal life and death ==
Kamenetz resided in Owings Mills with his wife, Jill Kamenetz, and their two sons.

Kamenetz was Jewish.

Kamenetz died in the early hours of May 10, 2018. He had awoken at 2 a.m., complaining that he felt unwell, and was taken to the University of Maryland St. Joseph Medical Center in Towson, where he was pronounced dead at 3:22 a.m., after going into cardiac arrest. It is believed that Kamenetz suffered a heart attack, though his family chose not to have an autopsy performed.

Flags throughout Maryland were ordered to be flown at half-staff by Governor Larry Hogan.

Two weeks later, the County Council chose Kamenetz's chief of staff, Donald I. Mohler III, to serve out the remaining months of his term.

== Honors ==
In 2010, Kamenetz received the Valleys Planning Council’s McHarg award for his efforts to reduce density, protect environmentally sensitive land and watersheds, and secure Baltimore County’s rural heritage.

In 2013, Kamenetz received the Outstanding Performance and Community Service Award from the Baltimore County Branch of the NAACP in recognition of his outstanding leadership of Baltimore County government and the significant increases in diversity among County employees.
