= Rossville, Maryland =

- Census-designated place
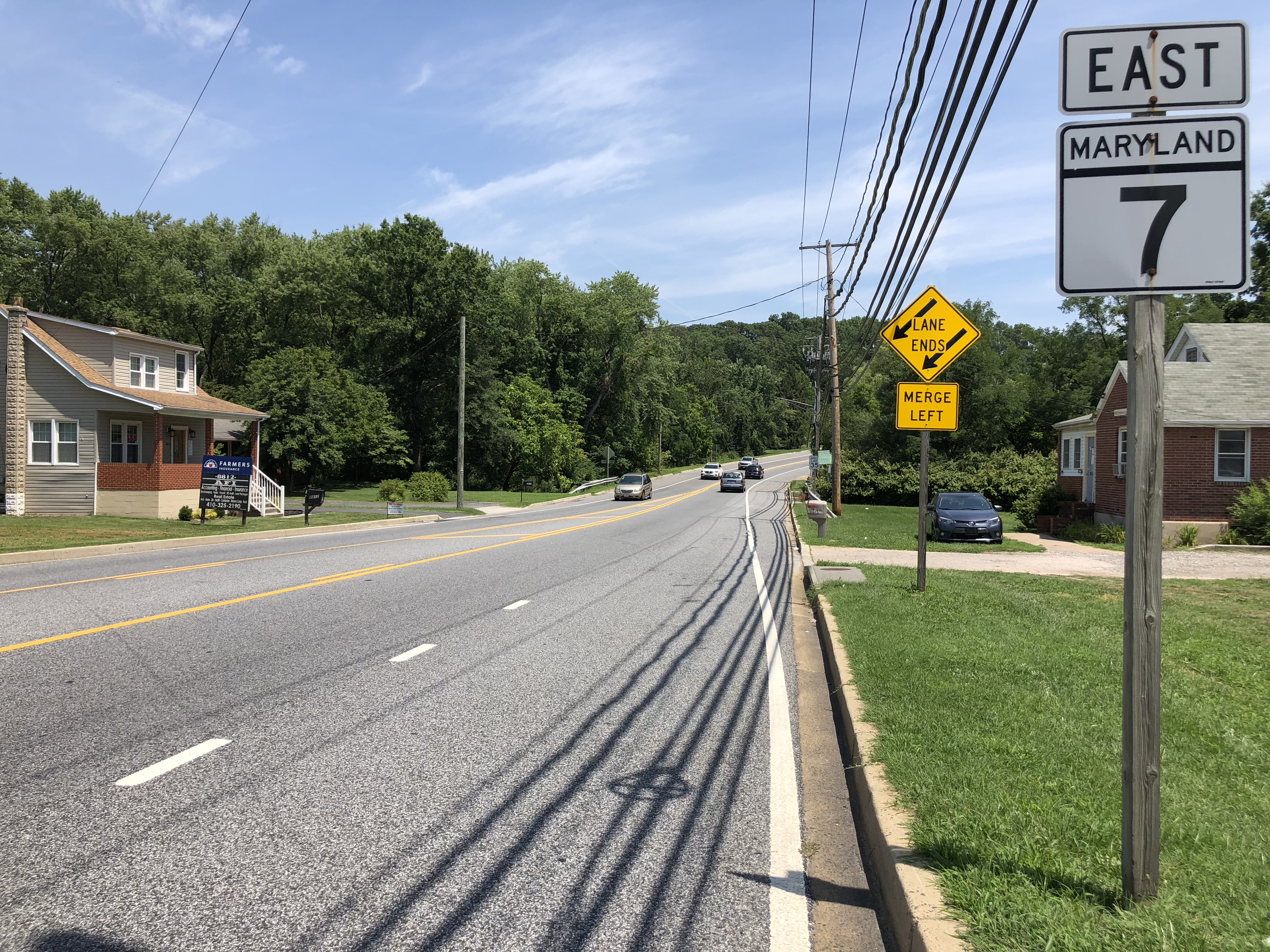
- Philadelphia Road at Ridge Road in Rossville, Maryland

- Location of Rossville, Maryland
- Coordinates: 39°21′21″N 76°28′43″W
- Country: United States
- State: Maryland
- County: Baltimore

Area
  - Total: 5.40 sq mi (13.99 km^{2})
  - Land: 5.38 sq mi (13.93 km^{2})
  - Water: 0.023 sq mi (0.06 km^{2})
- Elevation: 43 ft (13 m)

Population (2020)
  - Total: 16,029
  - Density: 2,979.8/sq mi (1,150.51/km^{2})
- Time zone: UTC−5 (Eastern (EST))
  - Summer (DST): UTC−4 (EDT)
- FIPS code: 24-68700
- GNIS feature ID: 0591188

Rossville is an unincorporated community and census-designated place in Baltimore County, Maryland, United States. The population was 15,147 at the 2010 census.

== Geography ==
Rossville is located at 39°21′21″N 76°28′43″W (39.355897, −76.478732).

According to the United States Census Bureau, the CDP has a total area of 5.4 square miles (14 km^{2}), of which 5.4 square miles (14 km^{2}) is land and 0.18% is water.

== Demographics ==
Historical population
| Census | Pop. | Note | %± |
|---|---|---|---|
| 1980 | 8,646 | | — |
| 1990 | 9,492 | | 9.8% |
| 2000 | 11,515 | | 21.3% |
| 2010 | 15,147 | | 31.5% |
| 2020 | 16,029 | | 5.8% |
U.S. Decennial Census

=== Racial and ethnic composition ===
Rossville CDP, Maryland – Racial and ethnic composition Note: the US Census treats Hispanic/Latino as an ethnic category. This table excludes Latinos from the racial categories and assigns them to a separate category. Hispanics/Latinos may be of any race.
| Race / Ethnicity (NH = Non-Hispanic) | Pop 2000 | Pop 2010 | Pop 2020 | % 2000 | % 2010 | % 2020 |
|---|---|---|---|---|---|---|
| White alone (NH) | 7,969 | 7,452 | 5,485 | 69.21% | 49.20% | 34.22% |
| Black or African American alone (NH) | 2,497 | 4,585 | 6,739 | 21.68% | 30.27% | 42.04% |
| Native American or Alaska Native alone (NH) | 32 | 57 | 40 | 0.28% | 0.38% | 0.25% |
| Asian alone (NH) | 487 | 1,583 | 1,723 | 4.23% | 10.45% | 10.75% |
| Native Hawaiian or Pacific Islander alone (NH) | 0 | 4 | 5 | 0.00% | 0.03% | 0.03% |
| Other race alone (NH) | 33 | 46 | 111 | 0.29% | 0.30% | 0.69% |
| Mixed race or Multiracial (NH) | 168 | 378 | 627 | 1.46% | 2.50% | 3.91% |
| Hispanic or Latino (any race) | 329 | 1,042 | 1,299 | 2.86% | 6.88% | 8.10% |
| Total | 11,515 | 15,147 | 16,029 | 100.00% | 100.00% | 100.00% |

=== 2020 census ===
As of the 2020 census, Rossville had a population of 16,029. The median age was 36.3 years. 21.8% of residents were under age 18, and 13.3% were age 65 or older. For every 100 females, there were 90.1 males, and for every 100 females age 18 and over, there were 86.6 males age 18 and over.

100.0% of residents lived in urban areas, while 0.0% lived in rural areas.

There were 6,495 households, of which 29.7% had children under age 18 living in them. Of all households, 35.5% were married-couple households, 21.1% were households with a male householder and no spouse or partner present, and 36.2% were households with a female householder and no spouse or partner present. About 31.9% of all households were made up of individuals, and 8.4% had someone living alone who was age 65 or older.

There were 6,908 housing units, of which 6.0% were vacant. The homeowner vacancy rate was 1.4%, and the rental vacancy rate was 7.6%.

=== 2000 census ===
As of the census of 2000, there were 11,515 people, 4,811 households, and 2,819 families living in the CDP. The population density was 2,132.5 inhabitants per square mile (823.4/km^{2}). There were 5,157 housing units at an average density of 955.1 per square mile (368.8/km^{2}). The racial makeup of the CDP was 70.60% White, 21.88% African American, 0.29% Native American, 4.26% Asian, 0.01% Pacific Islander, 1.24% from other races, and 1.71% from two or more races. Hispanic or Latino of any race were 2.86% of the population.

There were 4,811 households, out of which 30.2% had children under the age of 18 living with them, 40.3% were married couples living together, 13.4% had a female householder with no husband present, and 41.4% were non-families. 31.4% of all households were made up of individuals, and 4.0% had someone living alone who was 65 years of age or older. The average household size was 2.34 and the average family size was 2.98.

In the CDP, the population was spread out, with 23.0% under the age of 18, 11.4% from 18 to 24, 36.7% from 25 to 44, 19.8% from 45 to 64, and 9.1% who were 65 years of age or older. The median age was 32 years. For every 100 females, there were 95.2 males. For every 100 females age 18 and over, there were 91.2 males.

The median income for a household in the CDP was $47,545, and the median income for a family was $57,974. Males had a median income of $37,079 versus $30,006 for females. The per capita income for the CDP was $22,608. About 3.8% of families and 4.9% of the population were below the poverty line, including 4.4% of those under age 18 and 6.0% of those age 65 or over.
