= Baltimore County District Courthouses =

The District Court of Maryland for Baltimore County District Courthouses are located in Towson, Catonsville and Essex and serve as the courts of first impression for the majority of residents in the state of Maryland. Jurisdiction of the District Court includes most landlord- tenant cases, small claims for amounts up to $5,000, replevin actions, motor vehicle violations, misdemeanors, certain felonies, and peace and protective orders. The District Courts also have concurrent jurisdiction with the Circuit Court over civil lawsuits where the amount in controversy is between $5,001 and $30,000.

== Catonsville district courthouse ==
The Catonsville district courthouse is located in Rolling Crossroads Professional Park. Catonsville's former courthouse was relocated to its current location in a $2.5 million dollar agreement, and construction cost $54.5 million dollars.

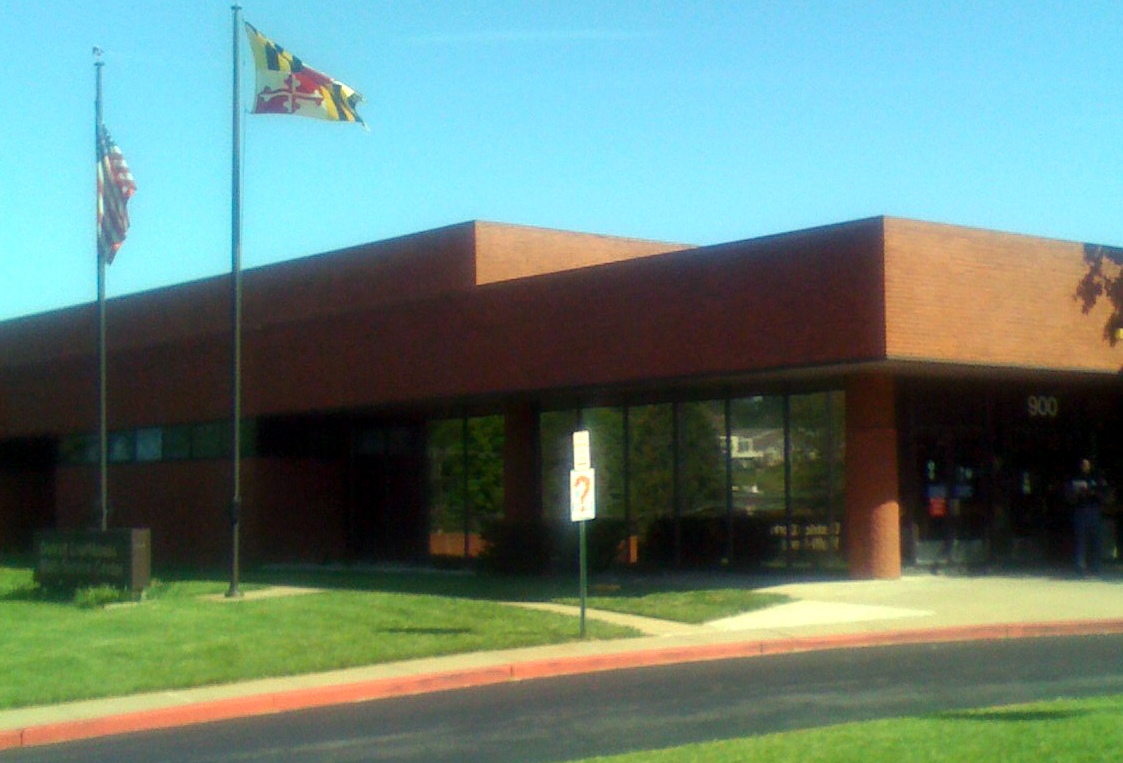
Former Catonsville District Courthouse 39°15′37″N 76°42′56″W

Catonsville's former district courthouse at 900 Walker Avenue had three courtrooms for minor criminal and traffic matters and judges chambers. Individuals arrested and charged with crimes originating in the southwestern, western, and northwestern parts of Baltimore County mostly had their cases tried in these courtrooms. The building itself is a multi-service facility with accommodations for the Baltimore County District Court commissioners, the Baltimore County Health Department, a local office for the Maryland Department of Parole and Probation, as well as offices for the clerk of the District Court of Maryland for Baltimore County.

== Essex district courthouse ==
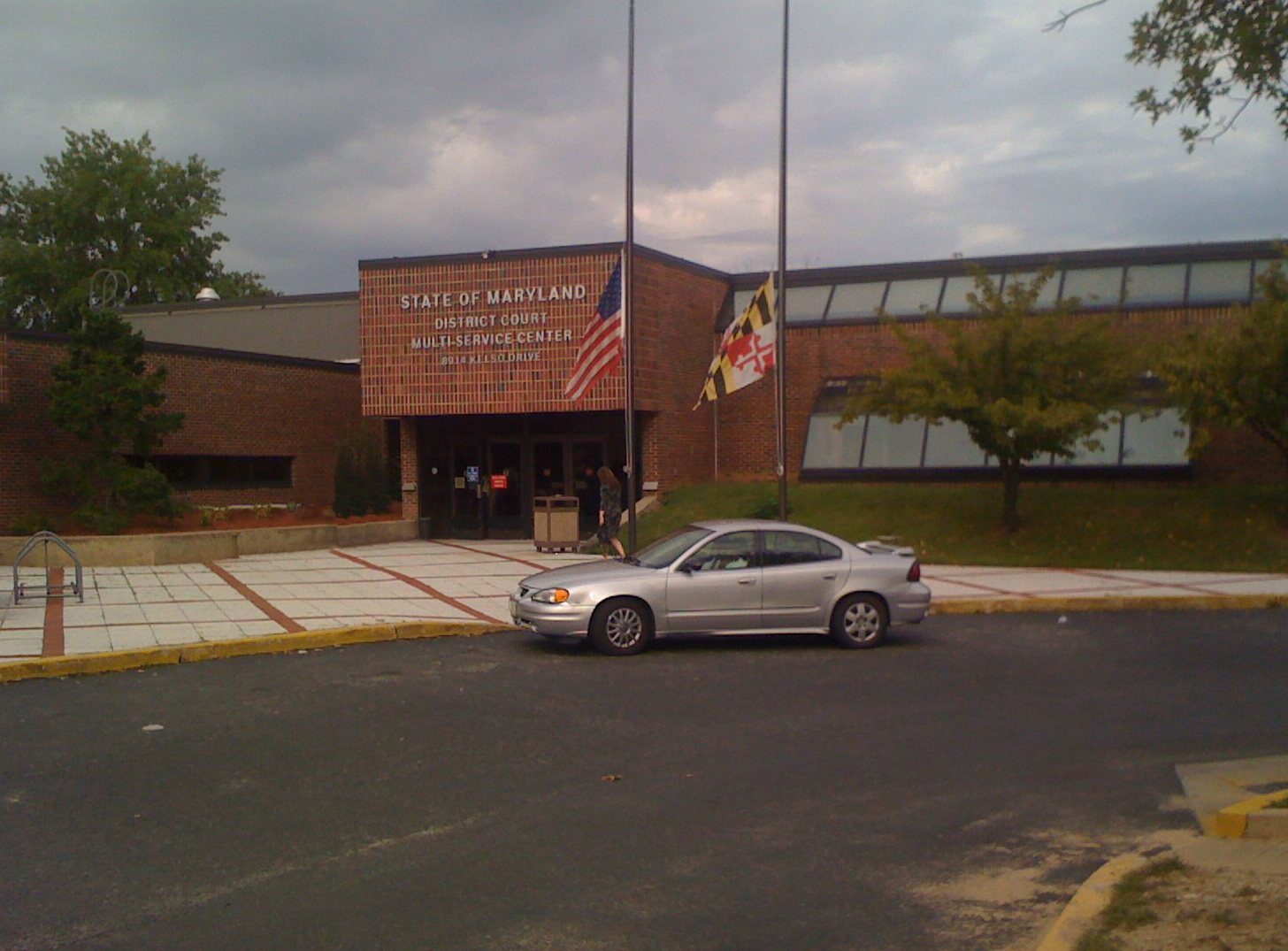
Essex District Courthouse 39°20′19″N 76°28′7″W

Located at 8914 Kelso Drive in Essex, Maryland, this courthouse also has three courtrooms for minor criminal and traffic matters and chambers for the three assigned judges. Individuals arrested for crimes committed in the eastern and southeastern sections of the county generally have their cases tried in this courthouse. The building itself is a multi-service facility with accommodations for Baltimore County District Court commissioners, the Baltimore County Health Department, local office for the Maryland Department of Parole and Probation, as well as the clerk of the District Court of Maryland for Baltimore County.

== Towson district courthouse ==
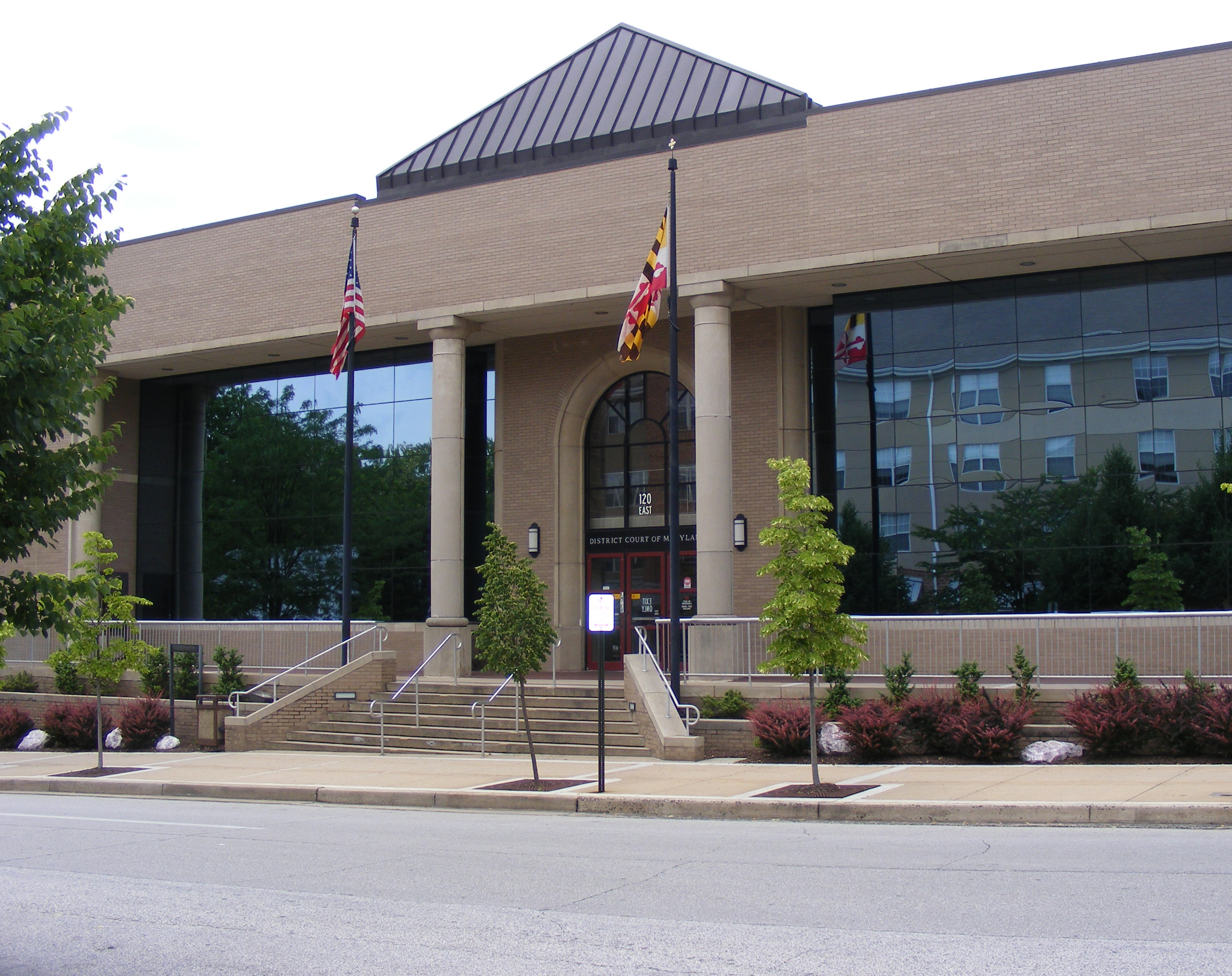
Towson District Courthouse 39°23′56.5″N 76°36′2″W

Located at 120 E. Chesapeake Avenue in Towson, Maryland, this courthouse has six courtrooms for minor criminal and traffic matters as well as chambers for the six judges and a modest law library. There are also accommodations for Baltimore County District Court commissioners and the clerk of the District Court of Maryland for Baltimore County. The Courthouse was built in 1994, according to a plaque inside of the building.
