= Immaculate Conception School (Towson, Maryland) =

Location
- 112 Ware Avenue; Towson, (Baltimore County), Maryland 21204; United States; 39°24′14″N 76°36′21″W

Information
- Type: Private
- Religious affiliation: Roman Catholic
- Established: 1887
- Founder: The Sister of St. Francis
- School district: Archdiocese of Baltimore
- Superintendent: Sr. Patricia McCarron, S.S.N.D., Ph.D.
- Principal: Mrs. Terri Castelli
- Head of school: Father Ernest Cibelli, pastor
- Grades: Pre-K–8
- Colors: Blue/Light blue and Gold
- Slogan: Immaculate Conception School - Academics, Community, Faith
- Accreditation: Southern Association of Colleges and Schools, Middle States Association of Colleges and Schools
- Alumni: over 10,000
- Website: www.theimmaculate.org/school/

Immaculate Conception School, is a Roman Catholic elementary school located in the Roman Catholic Archdiocese of Baltimore in the United States. It is affiliated with Immaculate Conception Parish and located in Towson, MD.
