= Nottingham, Maryland =

Unincorporated community in Maryland, United States

- Unincorporated community
- Location within the State of Maryland Nottingham, Maryland (the United States)
- Coordinates: 39°21′50″N 76°27′8″W
- Country: United States
- State: Maryland
- County: Baltimore
- Elevation: 62 ft (19 m)
- Time zone: UTC-5 (Eastern (EST))
  - Summer (DST): UTC-4 (EDT)
- ZIP code: 21236
- GNIS feature ID: 590911

Nottingham is an unincorporated community located mostly in Baltimore County, Maryland, United States, to the northeast of Baltimore, Maryland but with a small portion in Baltimore. It is 8.9 square miles in area with an average elevation of 62 feet (19 m) and an estimated 2024 population of 39,514.

ZIP code 21236, which eventually became Nottingham, was created in 1978 when the United States Postal Service split the Parkville (ZIP code 21234) postal zone into two parts due to rapid population growth in the area. The southeastern half of the Parkville postal zone was assigned the ZIP code 21236 and initially was served by the Parkville post office. When the 21236 ZIP code received its own post office in November 1990, the post office was named Nottingham after Nottingham Properties, a development company with major projects in the area such as the Nottingham Woods housing development, White Marsh Mall, The Avenue at White Marsh and the Nottingham Square shopping center.

Nottingham is largely residential although it also contains a major regional shopping hub that includes White Marsh Mall and White Marsh Town Center as well as office buildings, medical facilities, and an industrial park. It is often considered a broad area, encompassing many census-designated places (CDPs) and unincorporated areas. There is also a historical town in Prince George's County that was named Nottingham - it is now an archeological site.
