= Arizona Center =

Mixed-use and dead mall in downtown Phoenix

Coordinates: 33.4537°N 112.0693°W

- Exterior view after renovations (January 2020)

General information
- Status: Undergoing redevelopment
- Type: Mixed-use
- Location: 400 E. Van Buren St, 85004 (Tower One); 455 N. 3rd St, 85004 (Tower Two)
- Construction started: 1988; 38 years ago
- Completed: 1990
- Opened: March 1989; 37 years ago (Tower Two); October 1990; 36 years ago (Tower One); November 15, 1990; 35 years ago (The Shops, The Gardens)
- Renovated: 2017–March 27, 2019
- Closed: February 2025; 21 months ago (Tower One only)
- Demolished: Early 2027 (scheduled for Tower One, interior only)
- Owner: Presson Corporation
- Operator: Cushman & Wakefield; Reliance Management

Height
- Roof: 260 ft (79 m) (Tower One); 290 ft (88 m) (Tower Two)

Technical details
- Floor count: 3 (The Shops); 19 (Tower One); 20 (Tower Two)
- Floor area: ≈112,290 to 118,895 square feet (10,432.1 to 11,045.7 m^{2}) (retail); 500,000 square feet (46,000 m^{2}) (office)

Design and construction
- Architects: HKS, Inc. (Tower One); HNTB Architecture (Tower Two); ELS Architecture and Urban Design (The Shops); The SWA Group (The Gardens)
- Developer: The Rouse Company
- Main contractor: HuntCor, Inc. (towers); Kitchell Contractors, Inc. (The Shops)

Other information
- Parking: Arizona Center Garage

Website
- www.arizonacenter.com
- Building details
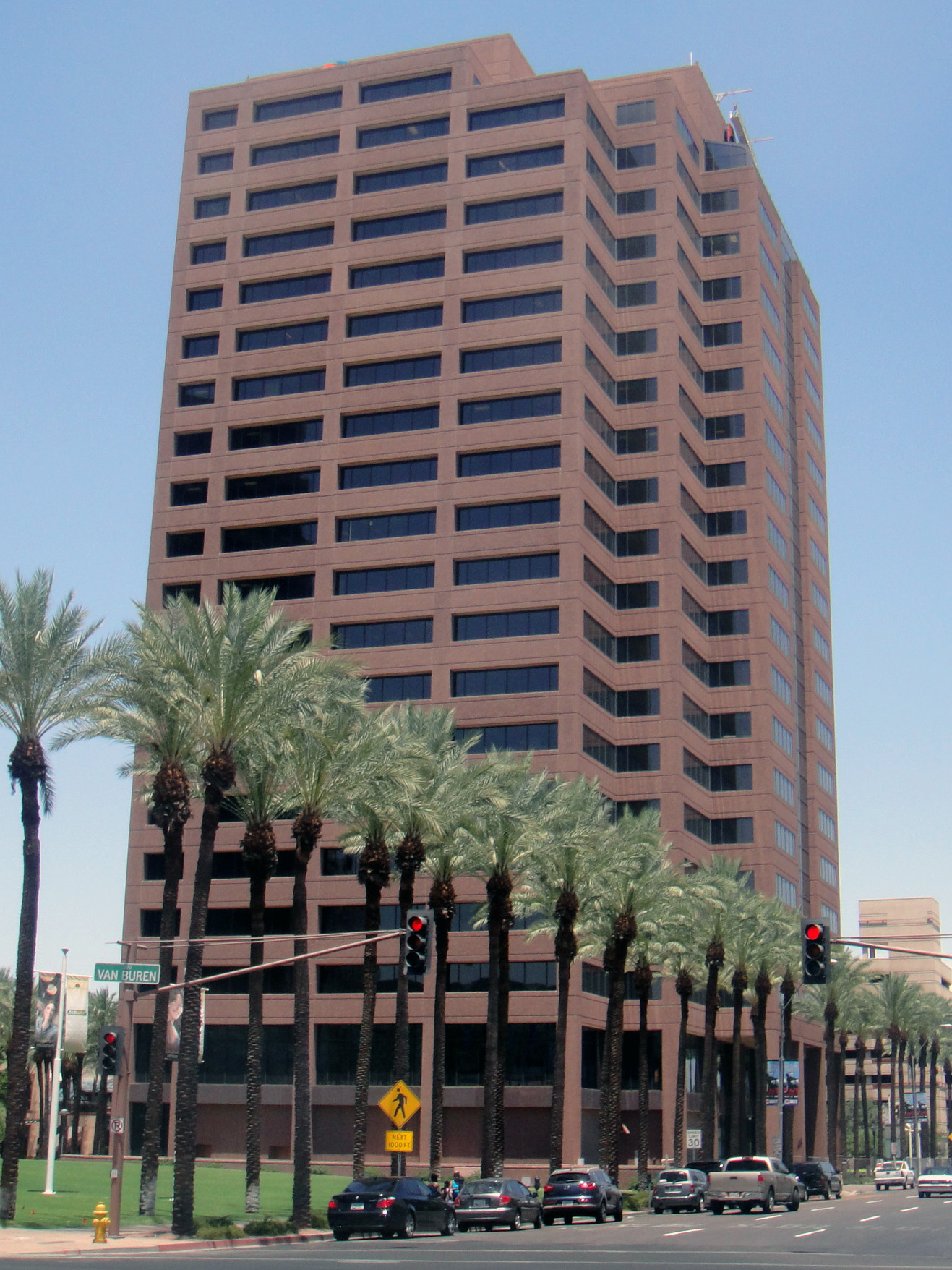
- Tower Two (July 2011)

Arizona Center is a mixed-use development consisting of an open-air shopping center known as The Shops at Arizona Center, and an enclosed office complex located in downtown Phoenix, Arizona, opening in between 1989 and 1990, with The Shops originally serving as a festival marketplace. However, as of 2020, the mall portion has failed, and is being redeveloped into a community space. PALMTower, part of the redevelopment, was completed in 2024. The complex features The Gardens at Arizona Center in the courtyard.

As of February 2025, One Arizona Center is completely empty. In August 2026, it was announced to be converted into JW Marriott Downtown Phoenix, which will require interior demolition that is slated to begin in early 2027. The Shops was renovated in between 2017 and 2019; prior to that, it originally featured nightclubs on the upper floors, which have since been permanently closed.

== Overview ==
Center court of The Shops, pre-renovation (December 2013)

Arizona Center features two office buildings, retail shops, and a movie theater known as AMC Arizona Center 24. One Arizona Center is 260 feet (79 meters) tall and has 19 floors. Two Arizona Center stands at 290 feet (88 meters) tall and has 20 floors. It is the headquarters of local electric utility Arizona Public Service (APS). Retail once offered a variety of restaurants, boutiques and tourist shops, most of which are now closed as of 2020.

The large central plaza at Arizona Center includes richly landscaped courtyards and fountains designed by the SWA Group, which won a National Merit Award by the American Society of Landscape Architects for its work on the plaza.

== History ==
=== Late 1980s: Planning and construction ===
Downtown Phoenix was heavily suffering from urban decay as population flight to the suburbs, due to a lack of residential density, sports complexes, office buildings and retail centers.

The Phoenix Community Alliance (PCA) found a 16-acre (6.5 ha) site (then known as the "Superblock") at the city's strategic core and assembling the necessary land parcels, selling it to the Rouse Company of Columbia, Maryland to develop the site into a mixed-use complex emphasizing office space, specialty restaurants, high-quality retail, and entertainment to attract visitors and tourists, aimed to save downtown Phoenix. Rouse founded the legal affiliate, Rouse-Arizona Center, Inc. for the development.

=== 1989–1990s: Opening and reception ===
Two Arizona Center opened in March 1989, with Arizona Public Service (APS) pre-leasing and occupying the building as its massive corporate headquarters. Around that time, 900 palm trees from California were imported into Phoenix, specifically for landscaping around a development area of six blocks.

One Arizona Center opened in October 1990, with the first Hooters location in Arizona opening on October 2 of that year. The Shops at Arizona Center had its grand opening on November 15, with great fanfare and high expectations, as it was considered one of the original components of the ongoing downtown revitalization efforts in Phoenix taking place since the late 1980s and early 1990s. The grand opening celebration featured the appearance of then-Mayor Paul Johnson, and a parade.

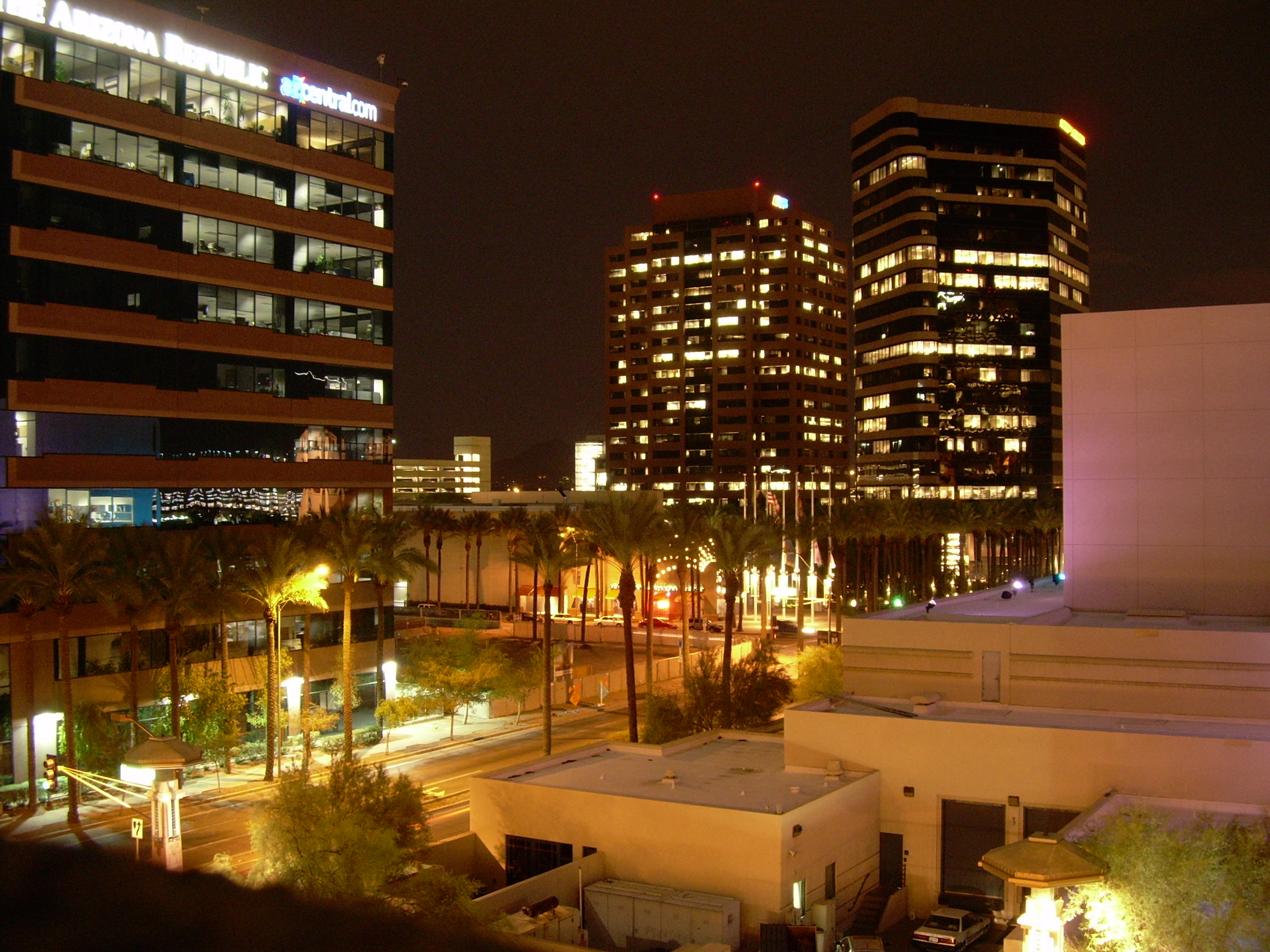
At night (February 2008)

The mall featured boutiques, galleries, tourist-oriented shops, restaurants, and the Gardenside food court on the second floor. The complex also included The Gardens at Arizona Center, which had lush waterways, green spaces, and a garden grotto, supporting revitalization efforts of downtown Phoenix. The expectations for success were high since Rouse also developed Faneuil Hall Marketplace in Boston, Massachusetts, and Harborplace in Baltimore, which Arizona Center was modeled after. The complex was expected to promote downtown redevelopment, but some critics felt suburban-oriented Phoenix was incompatible for a complex dependent on tourists and office workers. Critics have also pointed out the relative scarcity of permanent upscale apartment and/or condominium housing in the immediate vicinity as a factor in the lackluster performance of the complex.

Most of the residential districts surrounding the downtown area are middle-to-lower income, not adequate to support the middle-to-high-end marketing mix that Arizona Center set out to provide. Snell & Wilmer served as an anchor tenant for One Arizona Center starting in the 1990s.

=== 1998–present: Decline and redevelopment ===
Rouse expanded Arizona Center by adding a 24-screen AMC Theatres with stadium seating, which opened on March 6, 1998. However, the expansion did not halt the mall's declining status; by December 1999, The Shops at Arizona Center was largely vacant. Many of the initial retailers struggled to attract customers, and by late September 2003, The Rouse Co. announced that the food court would be closed and reconfigured into the Phoenix regional office of the Detroit-based architectural firm SmithGroup. By August 15, 2003, the mall's nightclubs included Decades Nightclub, America's Original Sports Bar, Little Ditty's Piano Bar, Fat Tuesday, and Moondoggies.

Rouse was acquired by Chicago, Illinois-based General Growth Properties (GGP) for $12.6 billion in November 2004. In 2005, GGP hired a broker to help attract tenants to potentially construct a third office tower for the complex, though this never came in fruition. Uno Chicago Grill permanently closed its doors in the summer of 2010, and would be replaced with a local restaurant called Brick Pizzeria and Wine Bar. After going through bankruptcy and struggles from the Great Recession, GGP sold Arizona Center to CommonWealth REIT on March 22, 2011. By August 11 of that year, Jayne's Marketplace closed. The Corner Bakery Cafe opened on October 24.

In December 2015, Arizona Center was acquired by a joint venture between Parallel Capital Partners and the New York-based Angelo Gordon & Co. for $126 million. The struggling complex then underwent a major $25 million renovation from 2017 to March 27, 2019, aiming to revitalize it and attract tourists and shoppers again by turning the shopping mall portion from an "introverted fortress" to an outward-facing property. The renovation modernized the complex, such as the addition of creative office spaces, outdoor work stations, and a 60-foot LED jumbotron. On April 13, 2018, Parallel Capital and Angelo, Gordon & Co. sold a 0.9-acre (0.36 ha) parcel of land within the complex for $4.027 million to Palm Court Tower LP, a legal affiliate of the North American Development Group (NADG), which planned to invest in $100 million to construct a 31-story apartment building which would initially be called the Palm Court Tower.

Despite being renovated, a major blow occurred when the COVID-19 pandemic happened. The white collar office workers from One Arizona Center, the APS high rise, and other downtown Phoenix office buildings started to work from home during the pandemic, and have never fully come back. Arizona Center lost 12 restaurants and all retail establishments during that period, including major, previously highly popular tenants such as Starbucks, Hooters, and Subway. At this point, the complex has been struggling as foot traffic fell to almost nothing, and the local management office admittedly does not expect to see foot traffic revive for several more years. Following the pandemic, tenant vacancies exacerbated, including Kwench Juice Cafe, which closed permanently in November 2020 due to a lack of revenue. In March 2022, Hooters permanently closed its doors. On October 24 of that year, Snell & Wilmer exited its One Arizona Center HQ and relocated to CityScape. The complex was acquired by Reliance Management and the local developer Presson Corporation in mid-2023, and is undergoing community-centered redevelopment.

The Palm Court Tower project was rebranded and shortened to just PALMtower, which represented a significant expansion of the Arizona Center's mixed-use offerings, introducing a 28-story residential tower with 352 luxury apartment units ranging from studios to three-bedroom layouts. The tower began construction in early 2022, was topped out in the summer of 2023, and opened in early 2024, designed by Will Bruder Architects and Lamar Johnson Collaborative. It is located at the northwest corner of E. Van Buren St and N. 5th St. PALMTower also features a 17,500-square-foot (1,630 m^{2}) seventh-floor amenity level that includes an outdoor pool, spa, indoor-outdoor commons, fitness center, yoga studio, residents' club, and lounge spaces with panoramic views of the Phoenix skyline. PALMTower also includes a seven-level parking podium with space for 350 vehicles and a ground-level secure bike storage room for urban commuters. In February 2025, Visit Phoenix would move out of One Arizona Center in favor of CityScape, leaving the building fully vacant.

Pretty Decent Concepts, a restaurant development group known for winning two Foodist Awards (Best Signature Dish and Best Chef for the group's Wren & Wolf restaurant in Phoenix) for its creations, has announced that it is opening a pair of new restaurants and a martini bar in Arizona Center. Cleaverman and Uppercut, which are both steakhouses, opened at the complex in mid-April 2026.

==== JW Marriott Downtown Phoenix ====
Tower One (July 2011)

On August 11, 2026, LaPour Partners of Las Vegas, Nevada, announced that One Arizona Center will be converted into a 340-room JW Marriott for $200 million. The 18th and 19th floors will be repurposed into 15,000 sq ft (1,400 m^{2}) of elevated ballroom and meeting space, while the original 1990s interior will be completely gutted starting in early 2027. Actual construction will start in late 2027, with a projected opening date of 2029.

== See also ==
- Arizona Mills
- Circle East
- The Gallery at Harborplace, a similar project also developed by the Rouse Company
- List of historic properties in Phoenix, Arizona
- Towson Commons
- Westlake Center, McCamly Place, National Place, and Pioneer Place, all of which also developed by Rouse
