= Baltimore Transmission =

Former General Motors factory in Maryland, United States

Coordinates: 39°22′18″N 76°26′24″W

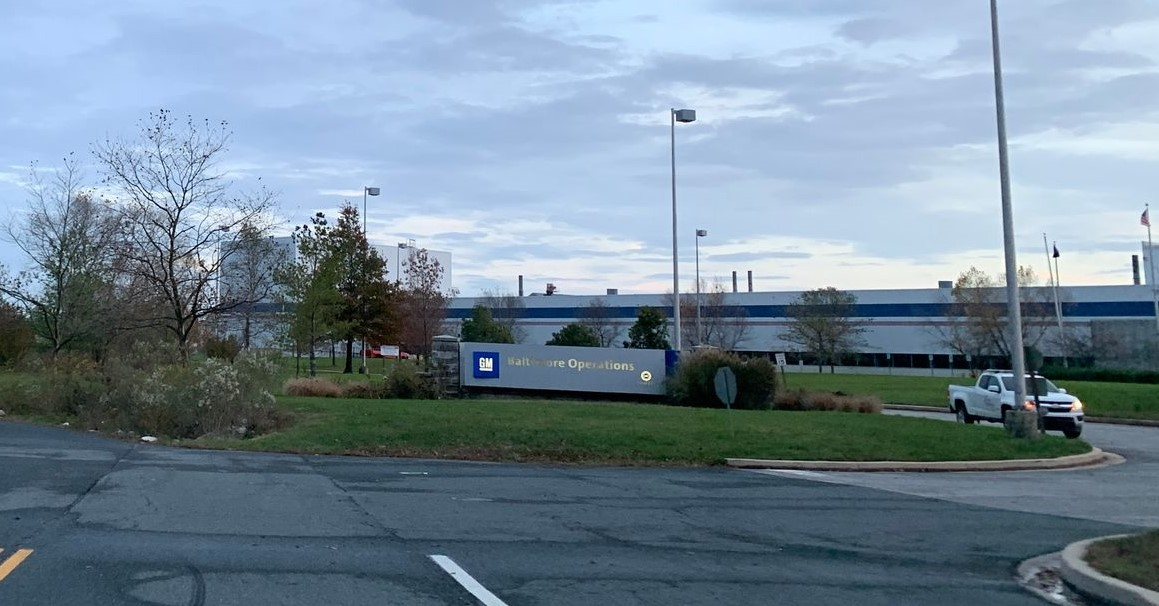
- The Industrial Park Road entrance to the factory in 2019
- Built: 2000
- Operated: 2000–2019
- Location: 10301 Philadelphia Road, White Marsh, MD 21162, U.S.; White Marsh, Maryland, U.S.
- Industry: Automotive
- Products: Transmissions; Electric motors
- Employees: 300 (2018)
- Volume: 471,000 ft^{2} (43,800 m^{2})
- Owner: General Motors
- Defunct: 2019; 7 years ago

Baltimore Transmission, also known as Baltimore Operations, was a General Motors transmission factory in White Marsh, Maryland, United States. It is located at 10301 Philadelphia Road and operated from December 2000 to May 2019, producing transmissions used in full-size pickup trucks as well as electric motors. The property has been purchased for office and industrial redevelopment.

== History ==
In May 1999, the plant was announced to be located on a former sand and gravel quarry, operated from the 1930s to the 1990s, near the White Marsh Mall. GM's Allison Transmission division received millions of dollars in economic incentives from the state of Maryland and Baltimore County as part of luring the facility to White Marsh. The first phase of the plant, a $202 million investment, opened in December 2000 and was officially dedicated on March 30, 2001; however, GM stalled on plans it had initially made to double the facility's size soon after opening.

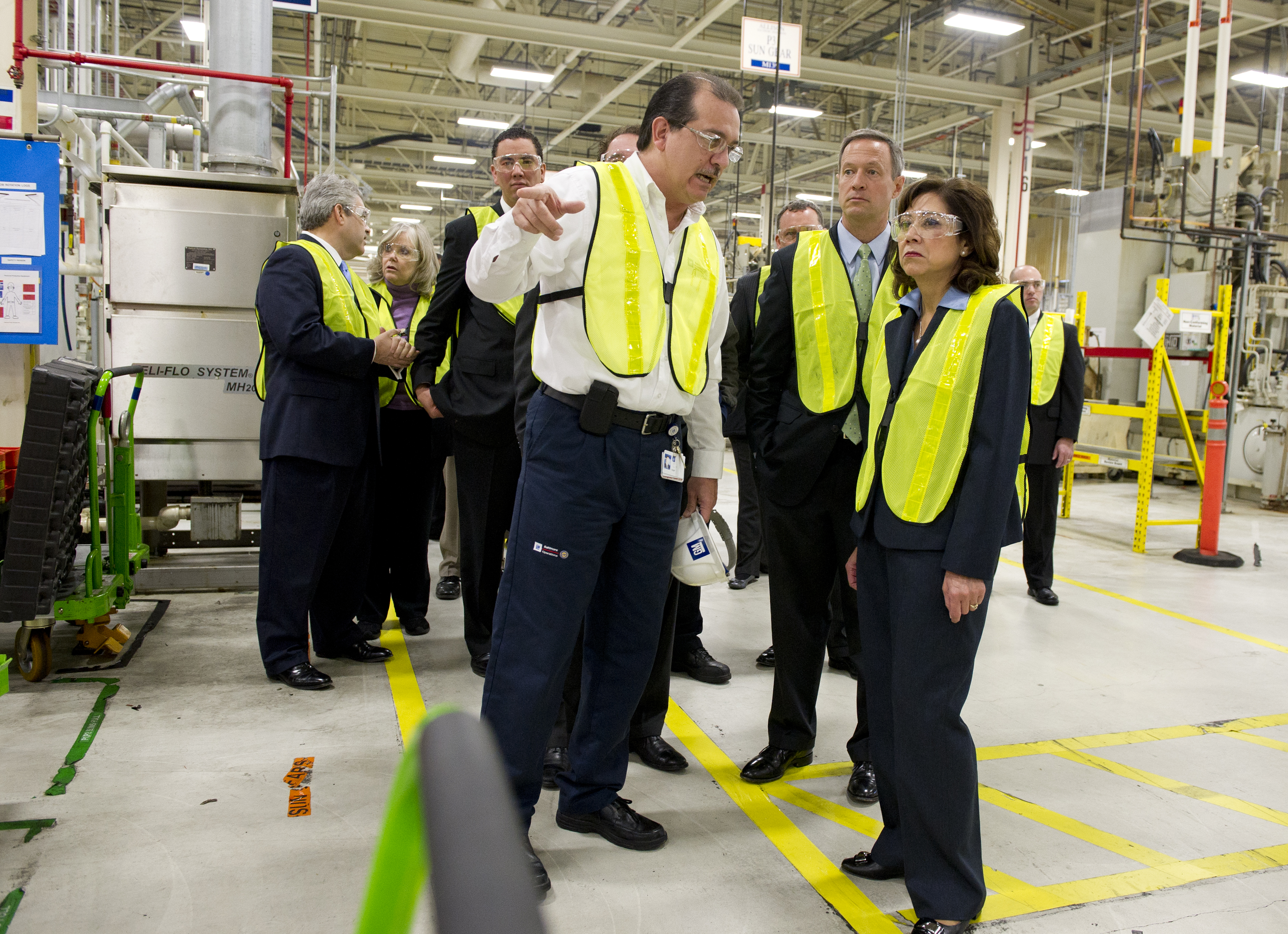
Maryland governor Martin O'Malley and Secretary of Labor Hilda Solis tour Baltimore Operations in 2012

In 2007, after a $118 million upgrade, Baltimore Transmission began to produce two-mode hybrid transmissions for 2008 model year Chevrolet Tahoe and GMC Yukon hybrids using the first transmission of this type developed in the United States. By 2009, the plant had 200 hourly and 40 salaried employees. In 2013, a new section of the facility began to produce electric motors for the Chevrolet Spark, after a $121 million investment by GM matched by $105 million from the United States Department of Energy.

GM announced in October 2019 that it would permanently close the factory, producing transmissions for full-size pickups, as part of an agreement with the United Auto Workers to end a strike by the union. It had already idled the facility, laying off nearly 300 employees, and four others under plans announced the previous year. It was GM's last plant in Maryland, after Baltimore Assembly on Broening Highway closed in 2005. Half of the workers transferred to GM plants in other parts of the United States; the other half either retired or quit.

In 2021, the plant site was purchased by Merritt Properties for redevelopment as nine new one-story buildings containing about 750,000 square feet (70,000 m^{2}) of office and warehouse space, replacing the existing 471,000-square-foot (43,800 m^{2}) transmission factory.
