= Towson Commons =

Mixed-use and defunct mall in Baltimore County, Maryland, U.S.

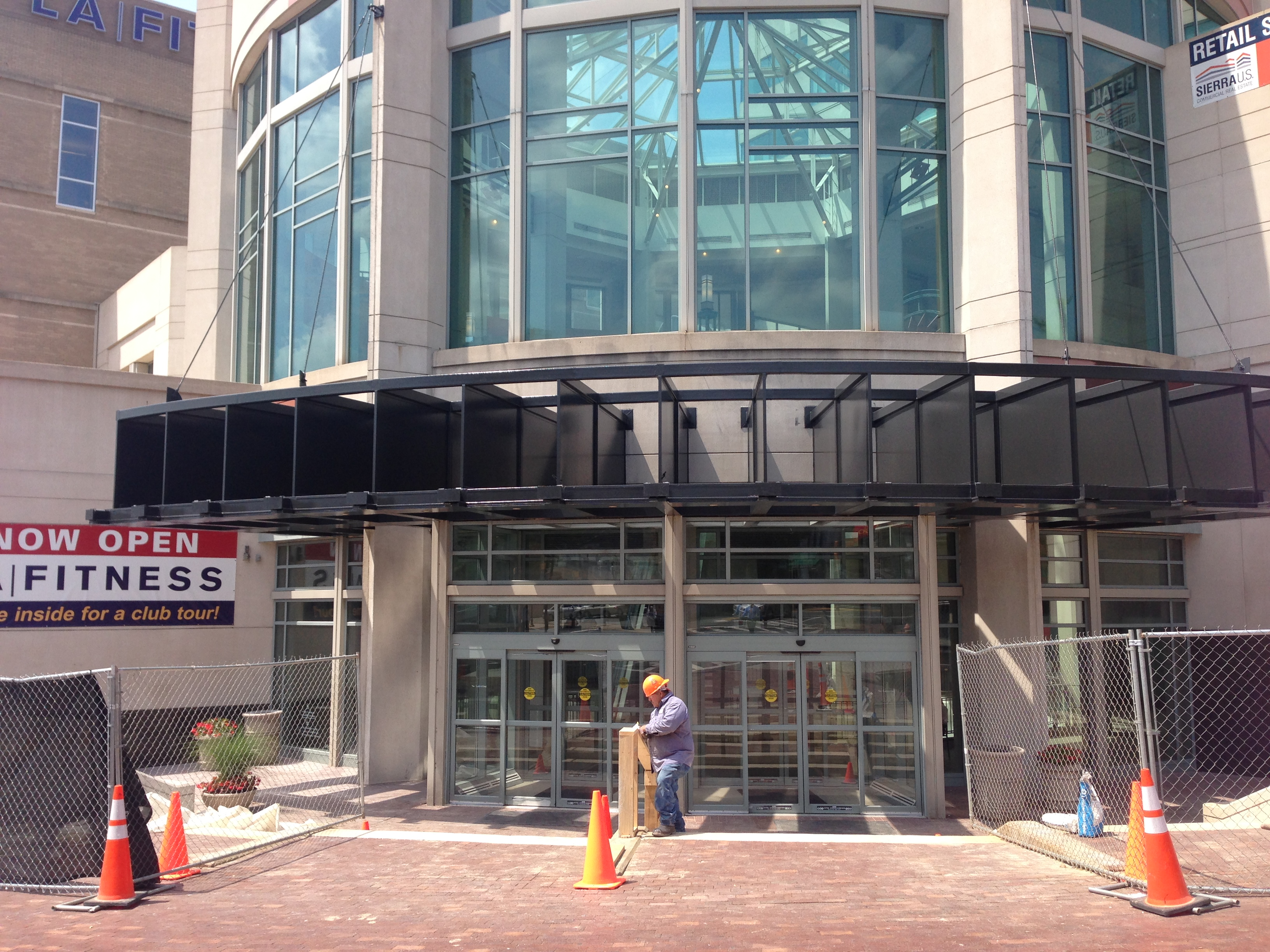
- Main entrance (June 2014)
- Location: Towson, Maryland, United States
- Coordinates: 39°24′0″N 76°36′12″W
- Address: 1 W. Pennsylvania Ave, 21204
- Opened: 1992; 34 years ago
- Renovated: 2012–2014
- Closed: May 15, 2011; 15 years ago (original mall)
- Demolished: 2012–2014 (interior of retail space only)
- Developer: Ward Development Company (1986–1989); LaSalle Partners (1989–1992)
- Manager: Cushman & Wakefield; MFI Realty; Towne Park
- Owner: MFI Realty and Woodmont Properties (retail operations); An anonymous New York investor (LA Fitness); CSG Partners (parking garage and office tower)
- Architect: RTKL Associates
- Num. of stores: About 4 (12 to 15 at peak)
- Num. of anchor tenants: 1
- Floor area: 329,269 square feet (30,590.1 m^{2})
- Floors: 3 (shopping mall); 10 (office tower)
- Parking: Parking garage with 862 spaces
- Public transit: TowsonLoop; MTA BaltimoreLink routes CityLink Red and LocalLink

Towson Commons is a mixed-use development in Towson, Maryland, featuring a three-story shopping center, a 10-story office tower, and an 862-space parking garage. The retail portion is owned by Towson Commons Retail LLC, a joint venture between MFI Realty and Woodmont Properties, the LA Fitness space is owned by an unnamed manager, and the office tower and parking garage is owned by CSG Partners.

The complex originally opened in 1992, featuring Borders Bookstore and an 8-screen movie theater initially operated by the General Cinema Corporation before being taken over by AMC Theatres. The retail portion ultimately became a dead mall, with restaurants such as Ruby Tuesday and Pizzeria Uno leaving or being evicted. Borders closed in May 2005, and the original mall ceased operations on May 15, 2011 after AMC's lease was terminated.

The property undergone a renovation which replaced the cinema with LA Fitness in April 2014. Other inline spaces and street-facing businesses were taken over by chains like CVS and Chipotle.

== History ==
=== 1986–1994: Development, opening, and early operations ===
In 1986, after assembling land parcels, Baltimore-based developer James Ward had plans to open a massive mixed-use destination in Towson, Maryland. His plan would originally include a hotel to revitalize the 400 block of York Road, but that plan was scrapped after he spent most of the late 1980s struggling to raise enough capital for it. As a result, the Chicago, Illinois-based investment firm LaSalle Partners took over the project. LaSalle faced a contentious year-long local zoning battle as a result of community pushback over the massive scale and height planned for the 10-story complex.

After securing approvals by late April 1991, the developers finalized plans for a complex featuring a 10-story office tower, a circular retail area, an 882-space parking garage, and a movie theater. The development would cost $70 million and have 190,000 square feet (18,000 m^{2}) of office space. Towson Commons started operations in early 1992, with Borders Books and Music, An Die Musik, an early wireless store that transitioned into an AT&T location, a food court that has Café au Lait, The Great Steak & Potato Co., Mamma Ilardo's Pizza, and Panda's Rice Bowl, L&N Seafood Grill, which opened in April of that year, and General Cinema Towson Commons 8 (later AMC Towson Commons 8), which opened on May 22. Harborplace tenant Pizzeria Uno would open in the summer of that year. Paolo's Ristorante opened in 1994.

=== 1994–2011: Decline and closure ===
The mall immediately started failing after just two years of operation. L&N closed after struggling to establish a strong foothold in the competitive Baltimore seafood market. It would be replaced by Ruby Tuesday in October 1994.

Towson Commons was sold to Utah State Retirement Investment Fund in 1997, which evicted Pizzeria Uno to convert the second-floor food court into office space. This triggered a massive lawsuit filed in 1999, with Pizzeria Uno citing breach of contract by not maintaining it as a "first-class shopping center." The Baltimore County Circuit Judge J. William Hinkel sided with the landlords in the summer of 2001, and in July 2002, the Maryland Court of Special Appeals argued there was no indication that Pizzeria Uno's revenue dropped as a result of the renovations. By late 2001, Towson Commons was largely unsuccessful, suffering competition from Towson Town Center and Towson Place, and cannibalization for being near the also-failing Towson Circle.

Borders closed in May 2005 to relocate to Lutherville Station in Timonium. In October of that year, the Washington, D.C.-based Western Development Corporation announced that they would purchase Towson Commons via a $65 million to $66 loan from New York-based lender Capmark Finance Inc., and had plans for a $30 million redevelopment to revitalize the struggling complex into a proper mixed-use development, which was approved in September 2006. Western operated under the affiliate Towson Commons LLC. Ruby Tuesday ceased operations on December 11, 2006 after management chose not to renew its lease due to declining foot traffic.

In May 2009, Paolo's closed even though manager Samantha Catts stated in The Baltimore Sun that they were "here to stay." Before Western's redevelopment plans were finalized, the Great Recession happened in 2008, causing Western Development to default on their $65+ million loan. In July 2010, Capmark Finance filed $59 million foreclosure proceedings against Western, and Towson Commons was put on auction on September 21 of that year on the steps of the Baltimore County Courthouse. Capmark Finance bought back Towson Commons for $28.5 million, less than half the price Western originally owed on it.

Towson Commons permanently closed its doors on May 15, 2011, when its last anchor, AMC Theatres, left after the owner terminated its lease. It also struggled from competition by newer cinemas with stadium seating. Competition from The Avenue at White Marsh and its own cinema, AMC Loews White Marsh 16, have been assumed by CBS News as the reason for its decline.

=== 2012–present: Redevelopment ===
By the end of 2012, the building began a major interior gutting, getting the former inline tenant spaces ready for office space and service. The space formerly occupied by AMC was modified to feature a basketball court, saunas, and a heated lap pool, with LA Fitness opening in that spot in April 2014.

On December 15, 2015, city-based developer MFI Realty formed a joint venture with Bethesda-based Woodmont Properties (operating under the affiliate Towson Commons Retail LLC) for $15.25 million from the Garrison Investment Group, which retained ownership of the office tower and LA Fitness. Revitalization would continue under the new owners, which would be able to lease out 115,000 square feet (10,700 m^{2}) of retail space also including General Dynamics. A 9,000 sq ft (840 m^{2}) CVS Pharmacy opened on September 16, 2016. A 2,908 sq ft (270.2 m^{2}) Chipotle Mexican Grill opened the following year on May 25, 2017.

In January 2018, CSG Partners of Baltimore purchased the 90% occupied, 231,000-square-foot (21,500 m^{2}) office tower and parking garage for $18 million. Garrison sold the 48,000 to 54,000 sq ft (4,500 to 5,000 m^{2}) LA Fitness space to an anonymous New York-based investor for $10.375 million on April 25, 2022.

== See also ==
- Arizona Center
- The Shops at Canton Crossing
- Georgetown Park
- The Gallery at Harborplace (mixed-use complex)
- Harbor Park Garage
- National Place Building
- White Marsh Town Center
