= White Marsh, Maryland =

Census-designated place in Maryland, United States

- Census-designated place
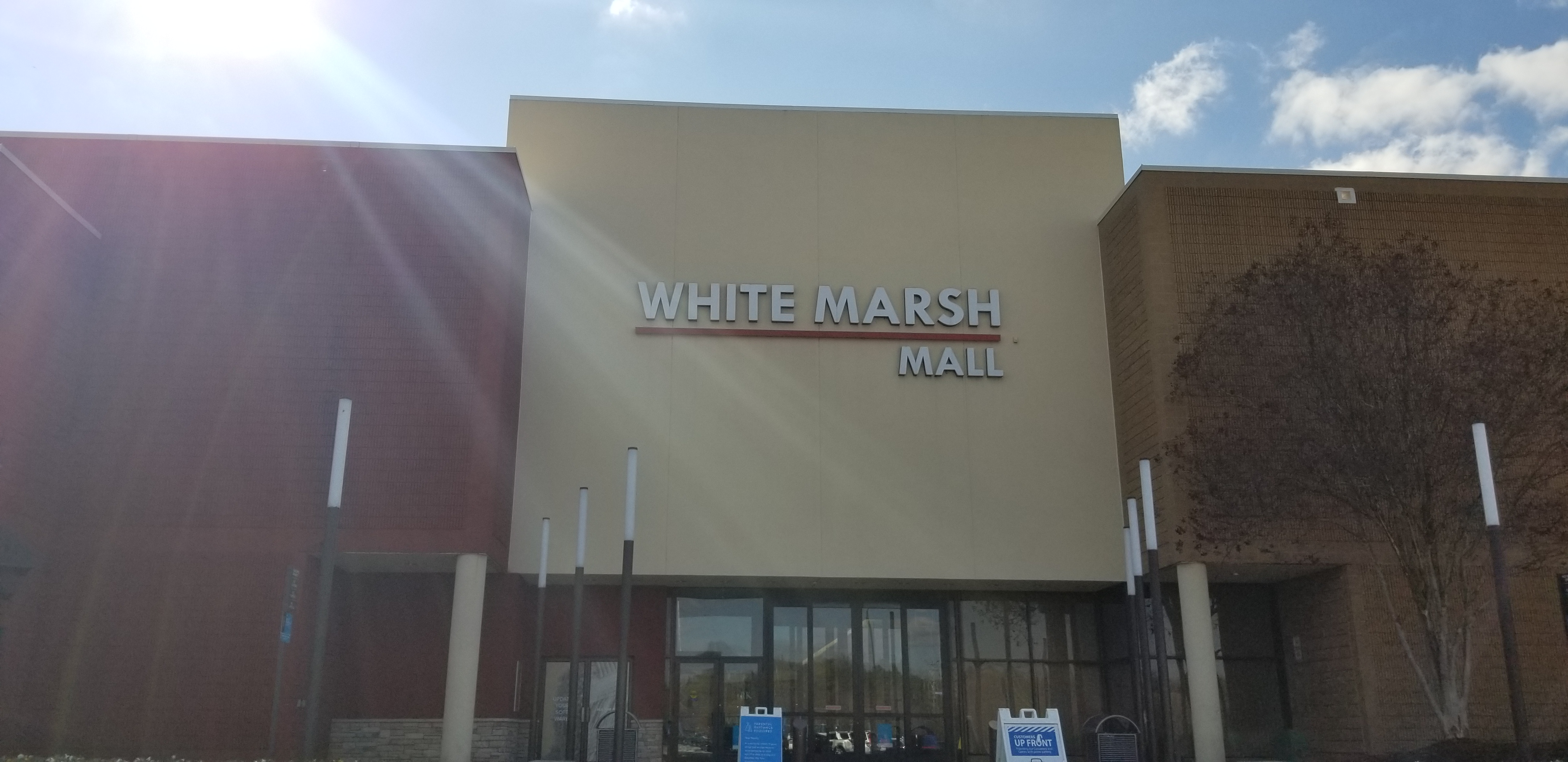
- White Marsh Mall in White Marsh, Maryland

- Location of White Marsh, Maryland
- Coordinates: 39°23′1″N 76°27′30″W
- Country: United States
- State: Maryland
- County: Baltimore
- Founded: 1965

Area
  - Total: 5.33 sq mi (13.81 km^{2})
  - Land: 5.31 sq mi (13.75 km^{2})
  - Water: 0.019 sq mi (0.05 km^{2})
- Elevation: 52 ft (16 m)

Population (2020)
  - Total: 10,287
  - Density: 1,937.2/sq mi (747.95/km^{2})
- Time zone: UTC−5 (Eastern (EST))
  - Summer (DST): UTC−4 (EDT)
- ZIP code: 21162
- Area code: 410
- FIPS code: 24-84350
- GNIS feature ID: 0591542

White Marsh is an unincorporated community and census-designated place in Baltimore County, Maryland, United States. The population was 10,287 at the 2020 census. White Marsh is a northeast suburb of Baltimore.

== History ==
In 1965, the largely undeveloped northeast corridor was identified by Baltimore County as the preferred site for intensive development. A town center was proposed to be located west of Belair Road at the planned intersection of White Marsh and Walther Boulevards.

The Harry T. Campbell Sons Corporation owned thousands of acres of land to the east of the planned town center, on both sides of Interstate 95. The land was bought in the 1930s and was being mined of its natural sand and gravel deposits. The Campbell family merged its sand and gravel business with an international building supply company. A new family-owned entity was charged with rejuvenating the family's property in northeast Baltimore County, which was covered with deep craters and pits.

In January 1943, the Cowenton Volunteer Fire Company was founded to counter the threat of incendiary bombings from the Axis Powers during the ongoing Second World War. The volunteer fire department, which was renamed the White Marsh Volunteer Fire Company in 2003, currently maintains a fire department and five vehicles, including two fire engines and an ambulance.

In the late 1960s, Nottingham Properties began analyzing the feasibility of a new town in White Marsh. From the first, the intent was to incorporate a variety of land uses and community services, including residential, retail, business, and industrial.

In 1969, a planning analysis of regional growth found development potential in the northeast brought about by the construction of I-95. The county was planning a series of arterial roads traveling in a northeasterly direction from Baltimore County that would pass through the Campbell land. The County agreed to move the planned town center east, to be developed on 1,500 acres (610 ha) of the Campbell land.

The plan was for a town center in an area created by a triangle of arterial roads. A mall would be at the center. The density of residential and business development would decline as it moved away from the mall. A residential sector was designated to the north, between Silver Spring Road and the planned White Marsh Boulevard. It would include all residential densities except high-rise. The area east of the town center to I-95 would be for office and research facilities. The Campbell land east of I-95 was slated for future industrial development.

Rezoning of the area was completed in 1970 and 1971. In 1979 the area was formally designated as a town center in the Baltimore County Master Plan.

From 1972 to 1981, the planning and development of the White Marsh Mall occurred, with the Rouse Company as owner and developer on land rented from Nottingham. In July 1973, Sears committed as an anchor store. In 1981, most stores opened. In 1992, Hecht's replaced Hutzler's. The White Marsh Mall is one of the largest regional malls in the Baltimore area, with five anchor stores and 190 specialty shops in about 1.4 million square feet (130,000 m^{2}). Next to the mall's property is the third IKEA store built in the United States, the oldest still remaining.

In addition to the Mall, 2,400 residential units have been built in the town center, and 700,000 square feet (65,000 m^{2}) of office and research and development space has been built. The General Motors Baltimore Transmission facility was built in White Marsh and operated from 2000 to 2019.

The White Marsh Library opened on January 25, 1988. It is part of the White Marsh Town Center, which includes the White Marsh Mall; the White Marsh Police Station, which opened in November 1987; the Nottingham Post Office, which opened in November 1990; and thousands of square feet of retail, industrial, and office space, which are still being developed.

== Geography ==
White Marsh is located at 39°23′1″N 76°27′30″W (39.383621, −76.458315).

According to the United States Census Bureau, the CDP has a total area of 5.3 square miles (14 km^{2}), of which 5.3 square miles (14 km^{2}) is land and 0.19% or about 2.6 hectares (6.4 acres) is water.

Nearby suburbs include Perry Hall to the north, Rosedale to the southwest, Middle River to the south and Parkville to the west.

== Demographics ==
Historical population
Census	Pop.	Note	%±
1990	8,183		—
2000	8,485		3.7%
2010	9,513		12.1%
2020	10,287		8.1%
U.S. Decennial Census

=== Racial and ethnic composition ===
White Marsh CDP, Maryland – Racial and ethnic composition Note: the US Census treats Hispanic/Latino as an ethnic category. This table excludes Latinos from the racial categories and assigns them to a separate category. Hispanics/Latinos may be of any race.
Race / Ethnicity (NH = Non-Hispanic)	Pop 2000	Pop 2010	Pop 2020	% 2000	% 2010	% 2020
White alone (NH)	7,349	7,120	6,298	86.61%	74.84%	61.22%
Black or African American alone (NH)	361	951	1,547	4.25%	10.00%	15.04%
Native American or Alaska Native alone (NH)	26	16	11	0.31%	0.17%	0.11%
Asian alone (NH)	452	970	1,523	5.33%	10.20%	14.81%
Native Hawaiian or Pacific Islander alone (NH)	3	2	0	0.04%	0.02%	0.00%
Other race alone (NH)	24	31	37	0.28%	0.33%	0.36%
Mixed race or Multiracial (NH)	84	160	422	0.99%	1.68%	4.10%
Hispanic or Latino (any race)	186	263	449	2.19%	2.76%	4.36%
Total	8,485	9,513	10,287	100.00%	100.00%	100.00%

=== 2020 census ===
As of the 2020 census, White Marsh had a population of 10,287. The median age was 40.0 years. 22.2% of residents were under the age of 18 and 16.3% of residents were 65 years of age or older. For every 100 females there were 89.9 males, and for every 100 females age 18 and over there were 86.3 males age 18 and over.

100.0% of residents lived in urban areas, while 0.0% lived in rural areas.

There were 3,879 households in White Marsh, of which 33.0% had children under the age of 18 living in them. Of all households, 52.7% were married-couple households, 14.1% were households with a male householder and no spouse or partner present, and 26.5% were households with a female householder and no spouse or partner present. About 22.3% of all households were made up of individuals and 9.6% had someone living alone who was 65 years of age or older.

There were 4,070 housing units, of which 4.7% were vacant. The homeowner vacancy rate was 1.1% and the rental vacancy rate was 8.0%.

=== 2000 census ===
As of the census of 2000, there were 8,485 people, 3,337 households, and 2,355 families residing in the CDP. The population density was 1,603.0 inhabitants per square mile (618.9/km^{2}). There were 3,420 housing units at an average density of 646.1 per square mile (249.5/km^{2}). The racial makeup of the CDP was 87.78% White, 4.28% African American, 0.32% Native American, 5.40% Asian, 0.04% Pacific Islander, 0.92% from other races, and 1.27% from two or more races. Hispanic or Latino of any race were 2.19% of the population.

There were 3,337 households, out of which 33.6% had children under the age of 18 living with them, 58.1% were married couples living together, 9.3% had a female householder with no husband present, and 29.4% were non-families. 22.1% of all households were made up of individuals, and 3.9% had someone living alone who was 65 years of age or older. The average household size was 2.54, and the average family size was 3.01.

In the CDP, the population was spread out, with 23.6% under the age of 18, 7.6% from 18 to 24, 34.2% from 25 to 44, 26.2% from 45 to 64, and 8.5% who were 65 years of age or older. The median age was 37 years. For every 100 females, there were 94.5 males. For every 100 females age 18 and over, there were 91.5 males.

The median income for a household in the CDP was $61,627, and the median income for a family was $70,600. Males had a median income of $46,171 versus $32,966 for females. The per capita income for the CDP was $26,317. About 3.1% of families and 2.7% of the population were below the poverty line, including 2.0% of those under age 18 and 7.9% of those age 65 or over.
