= White Marsh Town Center =

Mixed-use in Baltimore County, Maryland, U.S.

Coordinates: 39.3694°N 76.4518°W

White Marsh Town Center a 2,000-acre (8.1 km^{2}) mixed-use development created by Nottingham Properties, now owned by Corporate Office Properties Trust after they acquired Nottingham. As of March 2007, The Avenue and Shoppes at Nottingham Square are owned and managed by Federal Realty Investment Trust, while the next-door White Marsh Mall as of November 2024 is operated by Spinoso Real Estate Group after Brookfield Properties was stripped of ownership and management due to court-ordered receivership.

It is located in White Marsh, northeast Baltimore County, Maryland. The first phase of the project was Rouse's White Marsh Mall in 1981, and the following malls were developed by Nottingham from scratch, including The Avenue at White Marsh and Nottingham Square (and later Shoppes at Nottingham Square I & II). The Avenue features a 16-screen movie theater initially operated by Loews Cineplex Entertainment before becoming AMC Theatres, alongside Barnes & Noble and Silver Diner.

== History ==
Plans for White Marsh Town Center were proposed in 1965. Construction of the adjacent Interstate 95 in 1969 justified the proposal and plans for rezoning.

In 1972, Nottingham Properties began master planning a 2,000-acre (810 ha) tract of private landholding northeast of Baltimore, forming a partnership with the Rouse Company to develop and own a super-regional shopping mall on land rented from Nottingham. Rouse built and opened White Marsh Mall on August 12, 1981. Nottingham Square, located on Campbell Boulevard between Interstate 95 and Maryland Route 7. opened in 1994 as a discount power center, with Best Buy, Target, and Lowe's Home Center.

The Avenue at White Marsh
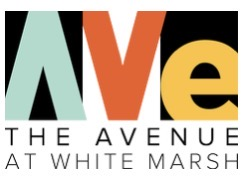

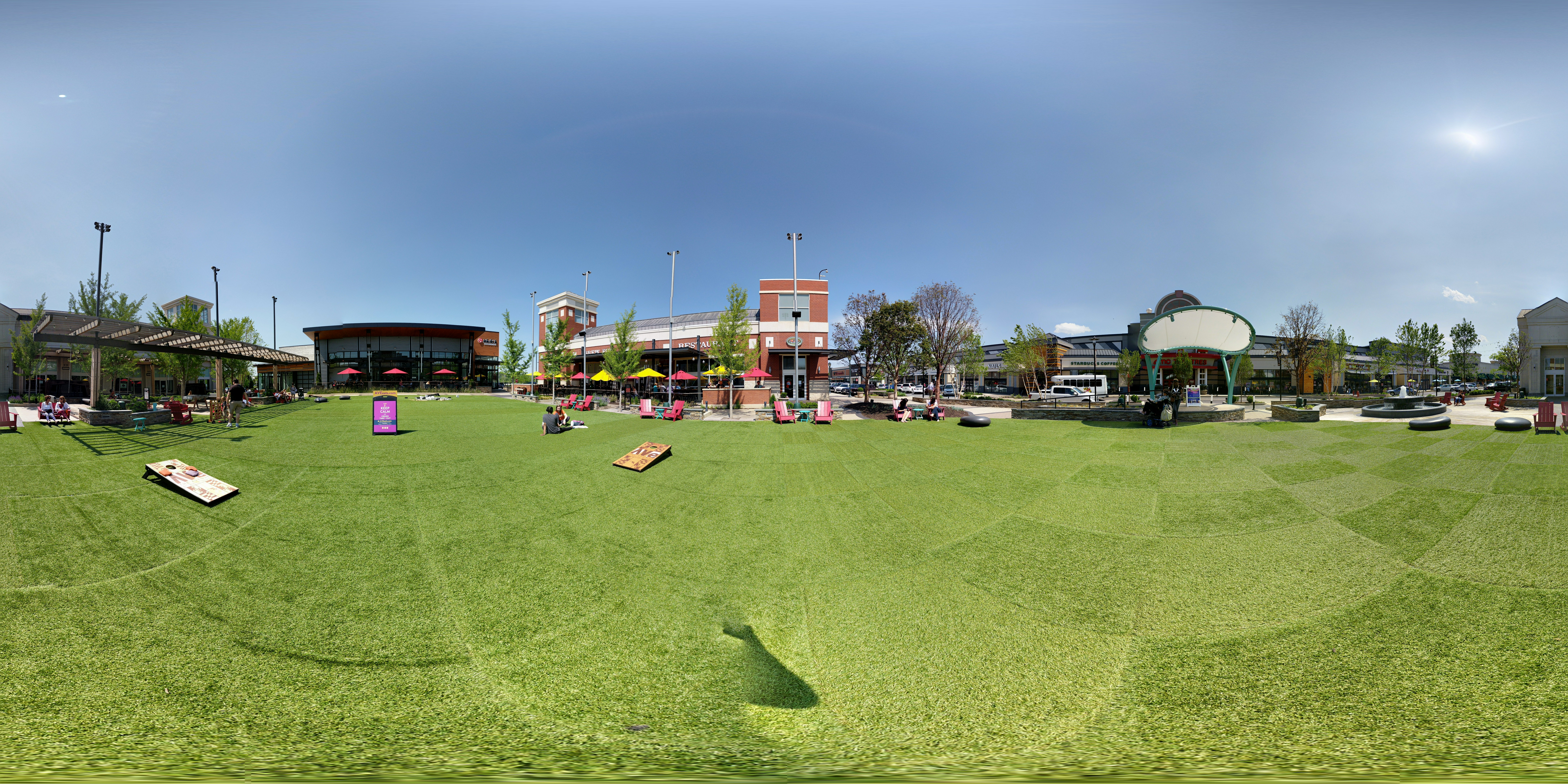
- Spherical panoramic view (May 2018)
- Location: White Marsh, Maryland, United States
- Address: 8125 Honeygo Blvd
- Opened: Late 1997 (first anchors); 1998; 28 years ago (The Avenue)
- Renovated: May 2016 – May 20, 2017
- Developer: Nottingham Properties
- Manager: Federal Realty Investment Trust
- Owner: Federal Realty Investment Trust
- Architect: RTKL Associates
- Num. of stores: 45
- Website: theavenueatwhitemarsh.com
- Building details

General information
- Construction started: 1996
- Completed: 1998

Renovating team
- Architect: BCT Design Group
- Renovating firm: Federal Realty Investment Trust
- Main contractor: Chesapeake Contracting Group

The Avenue at White Marsh (stylized as THE AVENUE at White Marsh) is a 300,000-square-foot (28,000 m^{2}) lifestyle center located south of White Marsh Mall.

The proposal for the Avenue at White Marsh in 1994 was modeled in part after the Reston Town Center, which also blends office, residential, entertainment and retail components. The Avenue stores are situated on both sides, at the beginning, and at the end of a quarter-mile main street. The layout was planned to feel old-fashioned from the stone plaza to the architecture. The Avenue faced initial criticism for being a "street without a town." The mall was developed as an open-air center in a suburb without such. Its design is drastically different from previous suburban malls and part of a wave of similar destination retail sites across the country. Construction on the Avenue started in 1996, and was completed in 1998 with original anchor tenants Barnes & Noble, Old Navy, and Red Brick Station. Sony Loews White Marsh 16, a 4,000-seat multiplex theater, would open on December 25, 1997 (Christmas Day) amid the premiere of Titanic. Loews White Marsh 16 rebranded as AMC Loews White Marsh 16 after AMC Theatres acquired Loews Cineplex Entertainment.

By May 2003, Starbucks Coffee operated at the mall. Federal Realty Investment Trust purchased The Avenue, White Marsh Plaza, and Shoppes at Nottingham Square for approximately $189 million in early March 2007. In May 2016, Federal Realty launched a massive, multimillion-dollar renovation for The Avenue at White Marsh, designed by BCT Design Group and landscape firm Studio 39, which would include an ice rink and expanded retail. Outdoor lounge seating and fire pits were placed near the center plaza to make the open-air layout pleasant during the winter, alongside decorative architectural lighting, updated water features, and public Wi-Fi. The second phase of this renovation took place in the spring of 2017, adding roughly 3,600 square feet (330 m^{2}) of new restaurant space, 35 parking spaces, and the Avenue held its grand redevelopment ribbon-cutting ceremony on May 20, 2017. Earlier that year, AMC Loews White Marsh 16 was renamed AMC White Marsh 16 & IMAX, and added plush, reclining seats and other infrastructure upgrades.

In 2018, a longtime tenant, Don Pablo's Mexican Restaurant, closed its restaurant at the Avenue in White Marsh, and the 7,800 sq ft (720 m^{2}) space was taken over by White Oak Hospitality-owned Wayward Smokehouse and The Curious Oyster, which held a soft opening in October 2019, followed by a grand opening the following month. The Avenue implemented a youth escort policy in February 2019.

On September 5, 2022, Barnes & Noble temporarily closed its doors to undergo a major renovation and downsizing. B&N did this to phase out its outdated 25,000-square-foot (2,300 m^{2})+ superstore format. 7,000 to 8,000 sq ft (650 to 740 m^{2}) of retail floor space was stripped away and walled off, while the remaining layout was gutted, forcing B&N into a tighter 20,000 sq ft (1,900 m^{2}) format. On November 15 of that year, Silver Diner signed a lease to take over the footprint B&N walled off.

In 2022, Wayward Smokehouse altered its menu and slightly rebranded to Wayward Bar & Kitchen before both them and The Curious Oyster were forced to close on June 12, 2023, to make room for another regional restaurant expansion known as The Local. The renovated Barnes & Noble would reopen on July 26, 2023, with brighter lighting and a new cafe. The Local, with 7,716 sq ft (716.8 m^{2}), immediately opened in August of that year. Silver Diner opened on May 1, 2024. The Local was forced to cease operations on June 12, 2026 after an eviction lawsuit for over $111,000 in unpaid rent, as Chef Trabbold and his Evolved Hospitality Group stepped away from operations.

== See also ==
- Circle East
- The Shops at Canton Crossing
- Towson Commons
