= Silver Diner =

American restaurant chain

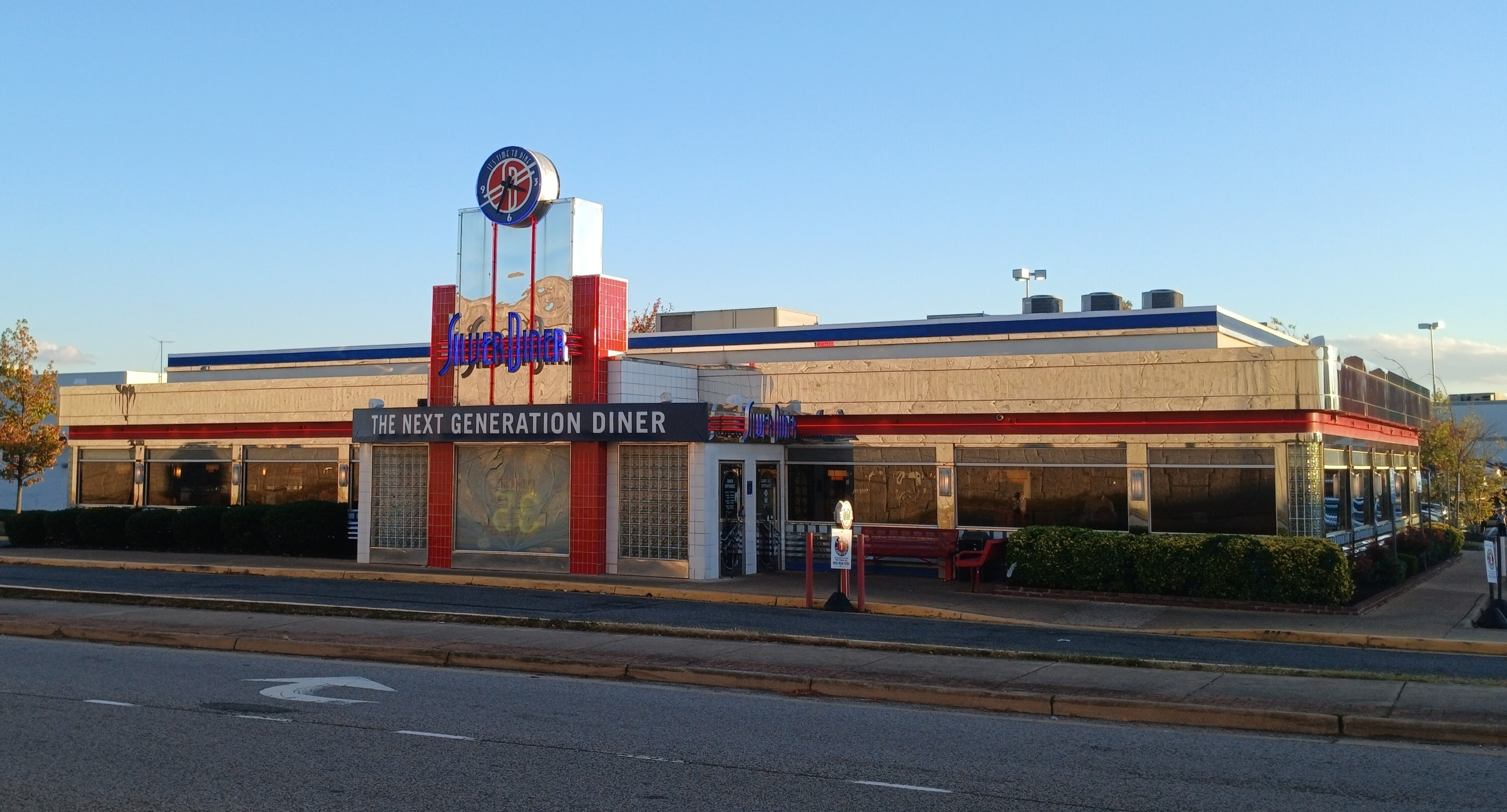
- A Silver Diner location in Springfield, Virginia, seen in November 2024
- Industry: Restaurants
- Founded: January 7, 1989
- Founders: Robert Giaimo & Ype Von Hengst
- Headquarters: Rockville, Maryland, U.S.
- Number of locations: 23 (March 2024)
- Area served: Maryland, Virginia, New Jersey, Washington D.C.
- Number of employees: 1,734
- Website: Silver Diner.com

Silver Diner is an American restaurant chain with locations in the Mid-Atlantic United States (Maryland, Virginia, New Jersey, Washington D.C.). Its corporate headquarters are in Rockville, Maryland, at its debut location.

== History ==
In 1989, Bob Giaimo and Ype Von Hengst opened the original Silver Diner in Rockville, Maryland. This original location has annual sales of $6 million. Silver Diner Development LLC. operates 23 restaurants in the mid-Atlantic region of the United States with locations in New Jersey, Maryland, Virginia, and Washington D.C. and employs over 1,700 people.

In 2007, Silver Diner established its first airport location with the opening of its sixteenth restaurant in the AirMall at Baltimore/Washington International Thurgood Marshall Airport (BWI).

In 2015, Silver Diner introduced a new restaurant chain called Silver, an upscale casual restaurant and bar featuring craft cocktails.

In 2016, Goode Partners made a strategic growth investment in Silver Diner.
