= Circle East =

Mixed-use and dead mall in Baltimore County, Maryland, U.S.

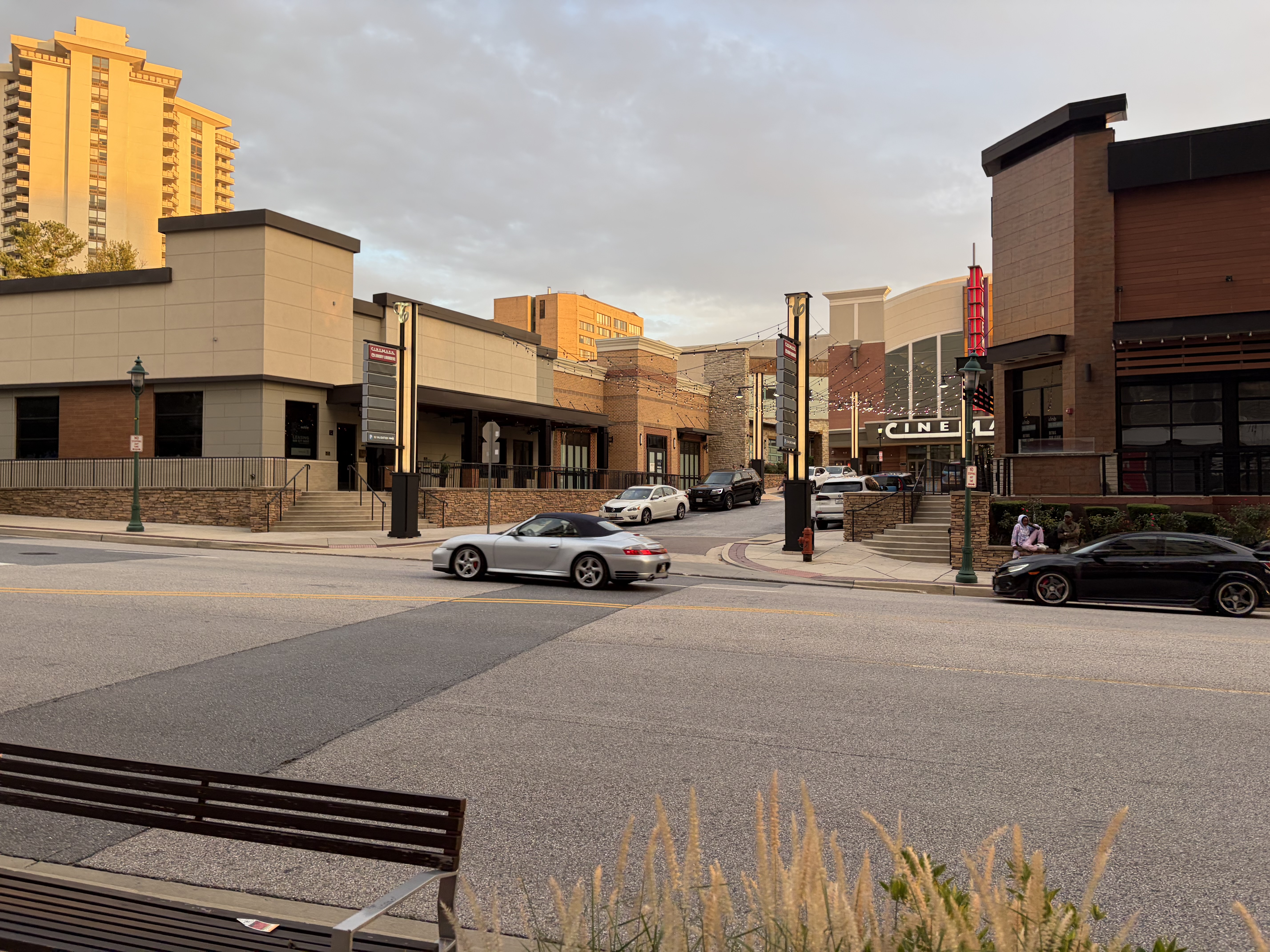
- Exterior view of Towson Square (August 2026)
- Location: Towson, Maryland, United States
- Coordinates: 39.4011°N 76.6013°W
- Address: 1 E. Joppa Road
- Opened: 1998–early 2000s (as Towson Circle); 2014–2015 (Towson Square); 2020–2021 (as Circle East)
- Renovated: 2017–2021 (Towson Circle)
- Previous names: Towson Circle (1998–2021); For Towson Square: Towson Circle III (planning, 2005–2012)
- Developer: The Cordish Companies; Heritage Properties, Inc.
- Manager: Tide Realty Capital; Vivmark Residential
- Owner: Tide Realty Capital
- Architect: Curry Architects
- Num. of stores: At Towson Square: 12 restaurants (at peak; none remaining as of July 2025); At Circle East: 13
- Num. of anchor tenants: 1 remaining (as of July 2025)
- Floor area: 138,065 sq ft (12,826.7 m^{2}) (Circle East); 82,650 sq ft (7,678 m^{2}) (Towson Square)
- Floors: 1
- Parking: Lighted lot, parking garage, 850 spaces
- Website: www.circleeast.com
- Building details

General information
- Status: Operational

Renovating team
- Architects: BCT Design Group; KTGY Architects
- Renovating firm: Retail Properties of America; AvalonBay Communities
- Main contractor: GreenBench Companies (Avalon Towson)

Circle East, originally known as Towson Circle, is a mixed-use development in Towson, Maryland, consisting of outdoor retail, Avalon Towson, and casual dining. An adjacent former restaurant district, known as Towson Square (originally proposed under the development code name Towson Circle III), was estimated to cost $85 million to be built by its developers, The Cordish Companies and Heritage Properties, Inc. It is anchored by the 15-screen Cinemark Towson and XD, and formerly featured several restaurants.

The development now occupies an area that was primarily parking lots located between East Joppa Road, Delaware, Virginia, and East Pennsylvania avenues. It incorporated an existing historic cemetery that borders on where Shealy Avenue had continued through the area. Shealy Avenue crosses roughly through the center of the development's property. Towson Square is adjacent (and becoming part of) Circle East. As of July 2025, Towson Square is almost fully vacant, with only Cinemark as its last remaining business. News outlets and visitors have described Towson Square as a dead mall.

== History ==
=== 1952–2001: Background and development ===
In 1952, Hutzler's relocated from its downtown Baltimore home after nearly 100 years there to open a three-story suburban branch in Towson, Maryland. However, it closed in January 1990 because the company was liquidating all of its stores due to business decline in the 1980s. Prior to the closure, the building was sold to the Hahn Company of San Diego, California in April 1988, which also later owned and expanded Towson Town Center. As of June 1995, Hahn repeatedly announced a replacement tenant, but the plans for them never happened, and the vacant building was infamously nicknamed "The Wall" and a "white elephant" as it acted as a barricade cutting off Towson Town Center from the rest of downtown. In late 1996, city-based firm The Cordish Companies formed a joint venture with local firm Heritage Properties, Inc., and began redeveloping the former Hutzler's into an open-air shopping center called Towson Circle.

In 1998, Towson Circle's first phase was completed. The former Hutzler's was replaced with Barnes & Noble, which opened the same year. It also included Trader Joe's. David S. Cordish and Heritage Properties planned this as part of a larger $25 million retail redevelopment project known as Towson Circle. By late 2001, Towson Circle was largely unsuccessful, as shoppers repeatedly favored Towson Town Center and Towson Place. Cannibalization was also a factor, as the also-failing Towson Commons was nearby.

=== 2004–2017: Creation of Towson Square and Circle East ===
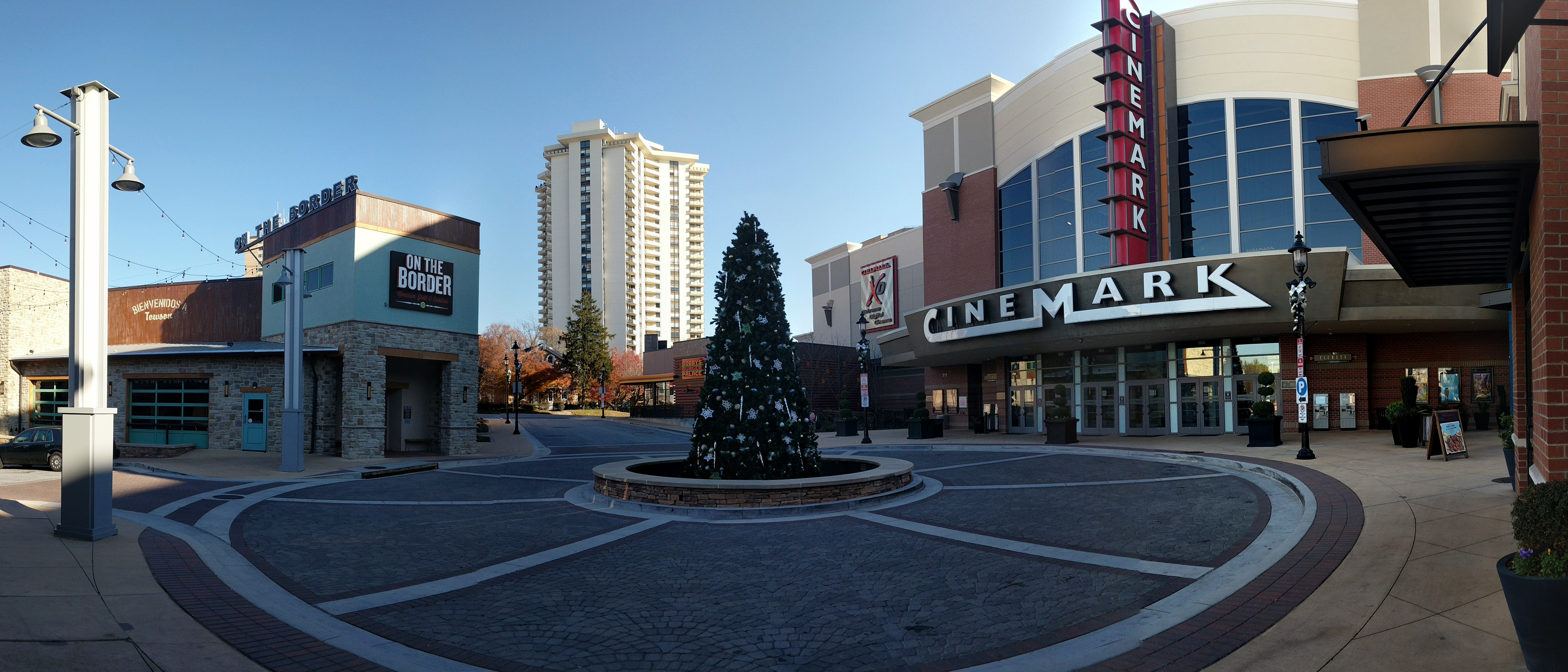
Panoramic view of Towson Square when it was thriving, as seen in November 2017.

Towson Circle was acquired by Inland Western Retail Estate Trust, Inc. (later Retail Properties of America Inc., or abbreviated as RPAI) in 2004. In 2005, Cordish and Heritage Properties spent several years trying to secure a 4.2-acre (1.7 ha) block of older downtown properties, alleyways, and disjointed parking lots between Joppa Road and Pennsylvania Avenue as an expansion of Towson Circle. The project was incorporated into Baltimore County's broader master plan in 2008, and Towson Circle III would be an $85 million dining and nightlife district. It was originally scheduled to start construction on December 31, 2009, but by November 14, 2010, zero tenants signed leases to occupy the space, despite plans to add a movie theater complex to the mall. Construction was pushed back to December 31, 2012, and it would cost $12 million to build a parking garage on the property. Director Andrea J. Van Arsdale stated in The Baltimore Sun that "Nobody's signing any leases now, and that's the stall."

On January 27, 2012, it was announced that Cinemark Theatres would be the tenant for Towson Circle III's planned cinema, joining Nando's Peri-Peri, On the Border Mexican Grill & Cantina, and La Tagliatella. The architect for the project would be Curry. By October 11, 2013, four restaurants have signed leases to operate at the upcoming mall, which would now be called Towson Square, being Bonefish Grill, Bobby's Burger Palace, BJ's Restaurant & Brewhouse, and Hanabi Japanese Restaurant, joining Cinemark. Building Towson Square required the demolition of a Burger King restaurant and an adjacent 1st Mariner Bank, which started in late September 2012. The rename to Towson Square was because Cordish director Taylor Gray revealed that it was "never intended to be called Towson Circle III," and that it would avoid confusion. The complex's Bahama Breeze restaurant and parking structure adjacent to Towson Town Center was officially Towson Circle II, though it is not commonly referred to as such.

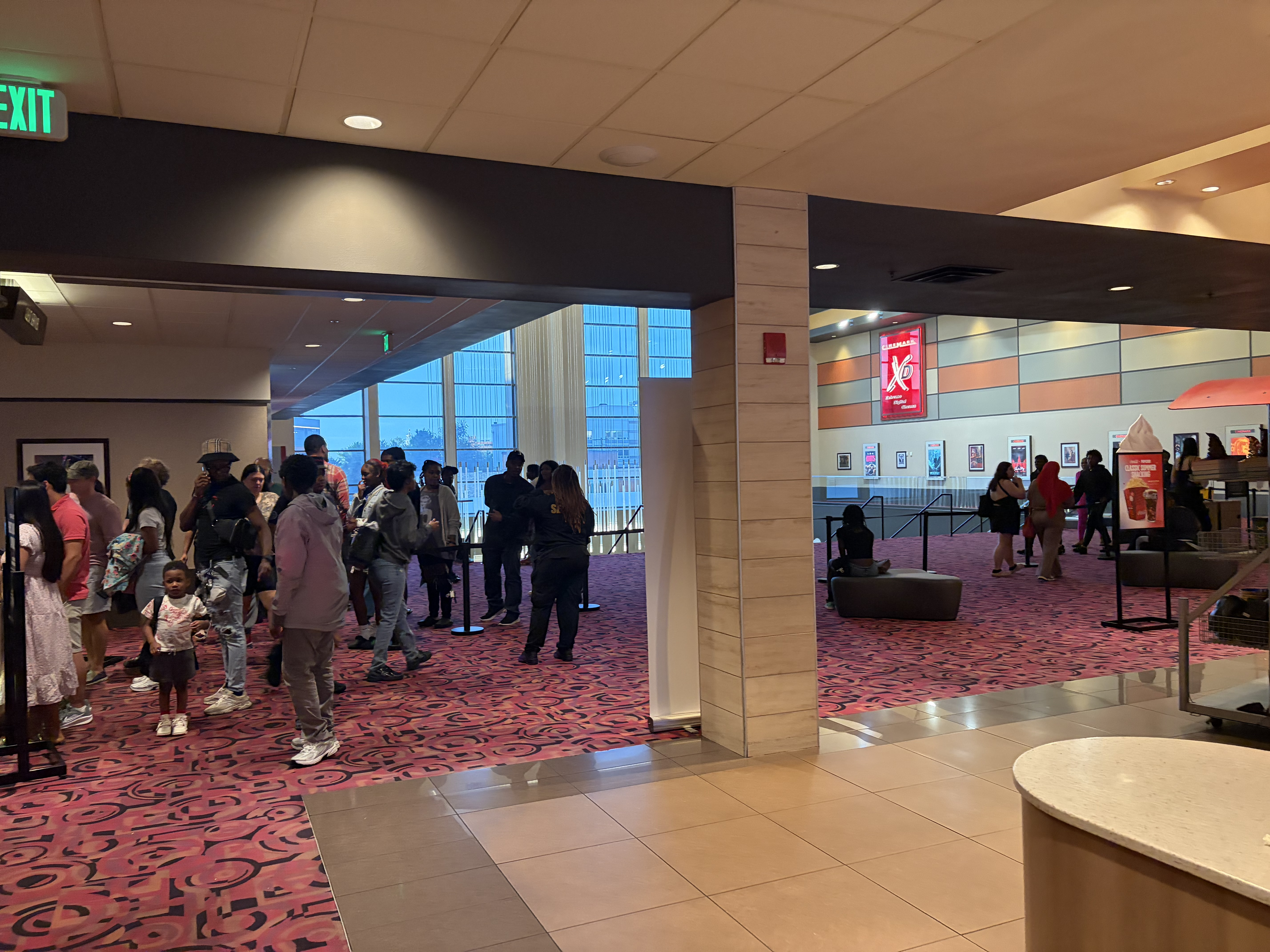
Interior view of Cinemark Towson and XD (August 2026)

On July 10, 2014, Cinemark officially opened its 15-screen movie theater at Towson Square as part of its 30-year anniversary celebrations. The theater featured Cinemark's then newest concept, a reserve level where people could actually reserve specific luxury seats in a special area and have an expanded food selection and alcoholic beverages. It also features Cinemark's NextGen concept that has been described as offering "the latest technology and amenities under one roof." The Baltimore Sun reported that the Towson Cinemark theater is Cinemark's official international flagship movie theater, replacing its former international flagship location in Dallas, Texas. Nando's followed, opening on July 16 of that year. On the Border debuted on October 27.

Bonefish Grill opened on February 16, 2015, followed by a ribbon-cutting ceremony the following day. BJ's Restaurant opened on June 15, of that year, and Bobby's Burger Palace began operations on July 30. Another tenant that debuted at the growing district was World of Beer at the end of September. On November 4, Towson Square was sold to RPAI for $40.5 million, thus allowing them to integrate the development adjacent into one entity called Circle East. Hanabi Japanese Restaurant closed after just two years of operation. The development of Circle East required Barnes & Noble and Trader Joe's to close their locations, alongside Bahama Breeze and Pier 1 Imports, for a major partial demolition and interior gutting. Trader Joe's relocated to The Shops at Kenilworth in mid-March 2017, while Barnes & Noble closed its doors in June of that year. They requested RPAI if they could downsize to a single-story layout to avoid leaving Towson and interfering with the redevelopment plans, but that was rejected.

=== 2020–present: Decline and future redevelopment ===
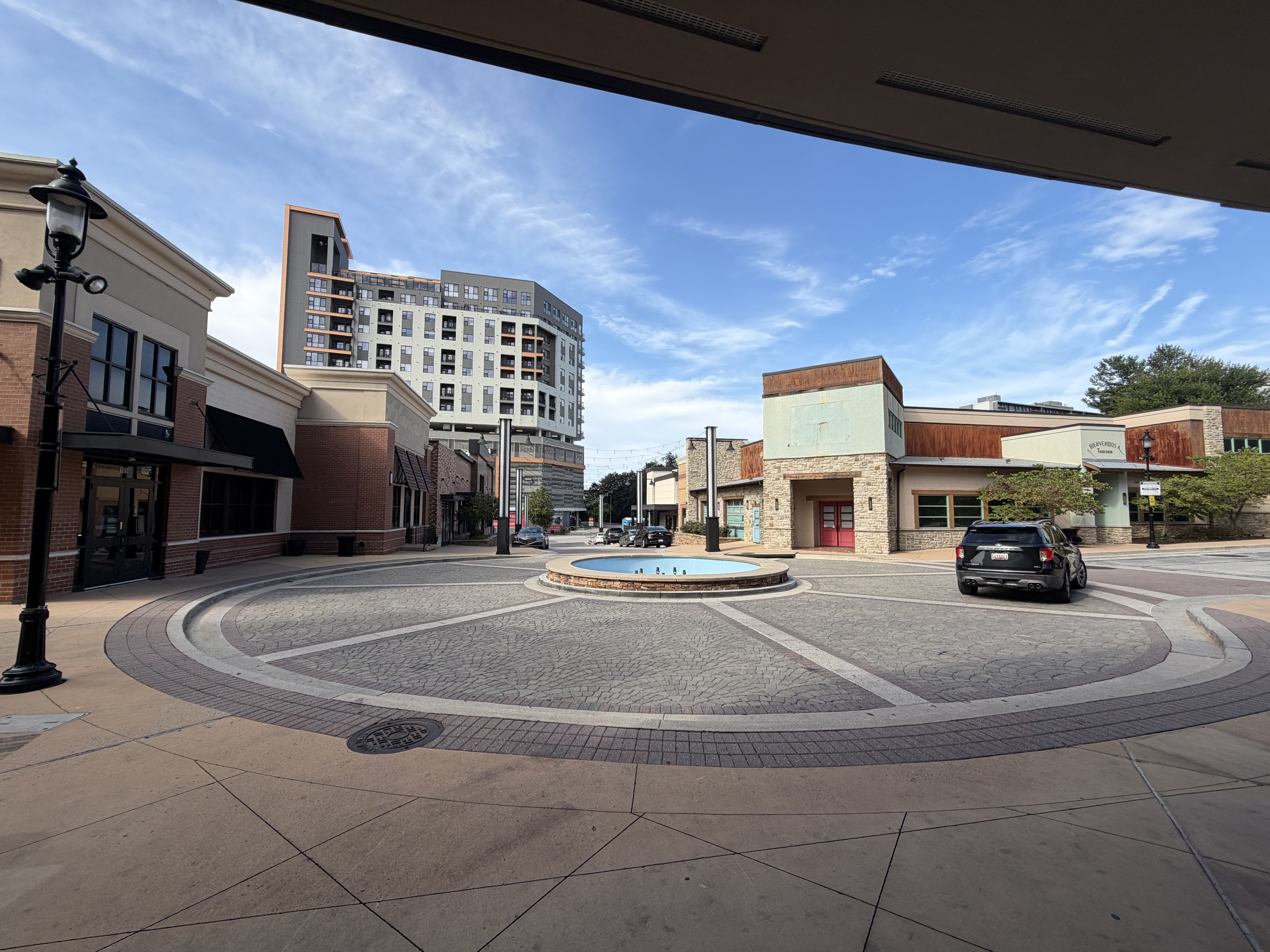
Towson Square is almost completely empty, as viewed looking from the entrance of Cinemark. Avalon Towson is visible in the background. – August 2026

Bobby's Burger Palace and World of Beer closed due to the COVID-19 pandemic. A 15-story, 795,000-square-foot (73,900 m^{2}) apartment building known as Avalon Towson, the residential component of Circle East, opened in August 2020. Circle East opened its first retail businesses in early 2021. Its tenants as of December 2025 include Shake Shack, which replaced the former Barnes & Noble space, Ethan Allen, and Sodium Tackle. In August 2023, BJ's Restaurant & Brewhouse closed as part of a nationwide decision to close five underperforming locations. Bonefish Grill closed in September 2023. The architect for the Circle East renovation and redevelopment was BCT Design Group.

Kite Realty Group Trust of Indianapolis acquired Circle East on October 22, 2021, via a $7.5 billion merger with RPAI. In March 2025, On the Border closed due to bankruptcy. In July 2025, Nando's Peri-Peri closed its location in Towson Square because it chose not to renew its lease after a decade. Since then, every restaurant at Towson Square has been shut down, leaving Cinemark as its last anchor. However, an article written in June of that year argues that even the Cinemark is beginning to struggle with lower attendance. Kite Realty announced that they were "exploring all options" to reconfigure the vacant spaces, stating that "it is evaluating a range of opportunities" for Towson Square, but no redevelopment plan has been announced under their ownership.

On November 5, 2026, Circle East and Towson Square were acquired by city-based firm Tide Realty Capital for $19 million, with Kite Realty providing a $15.2 million loan to Tide Realty as part of the transaction. Tide plans to aggressively work on leasing and revitalize both properties.

== Gallery ==
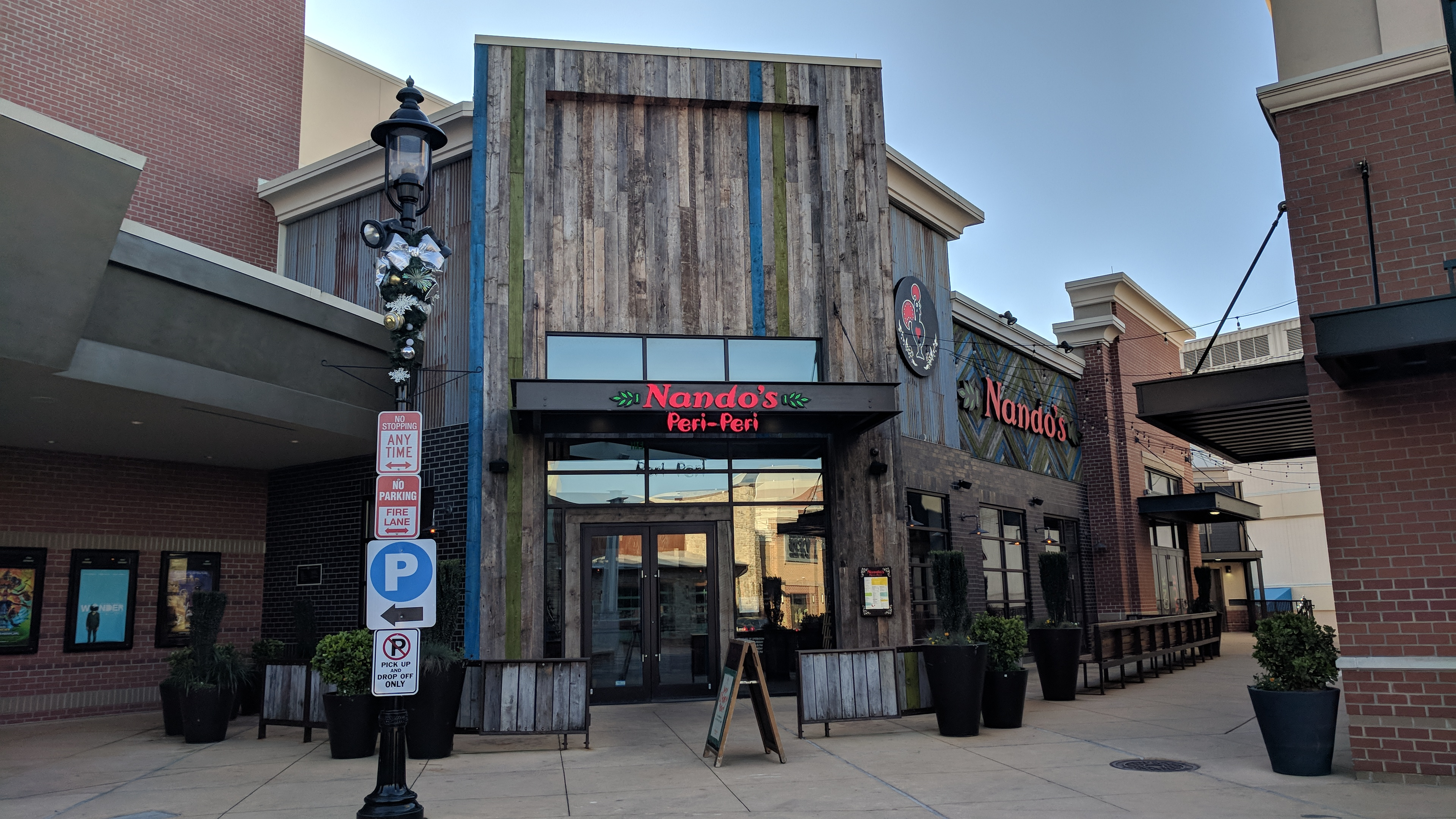
Nando's Peri-Peri (November 2017)

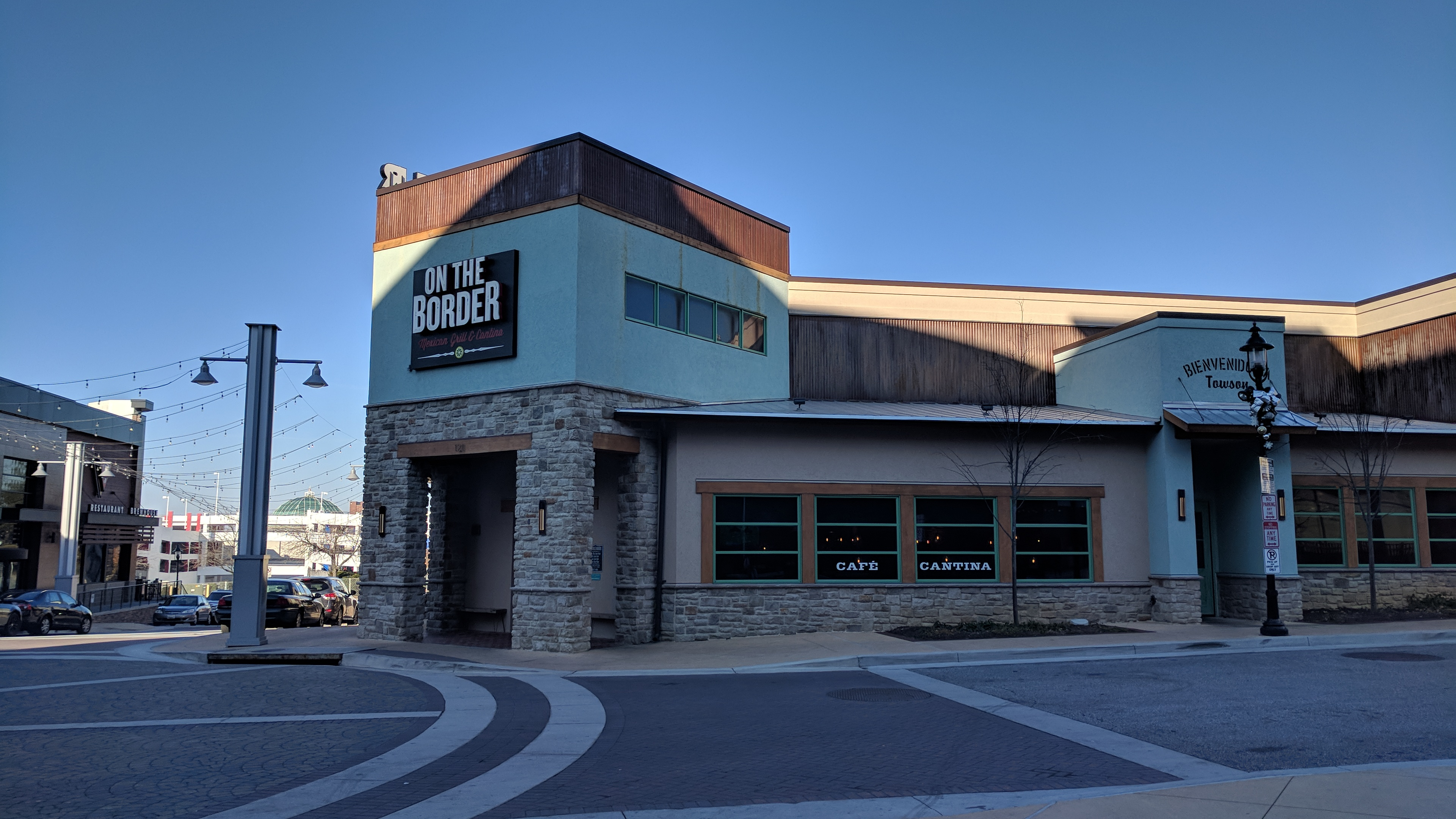
On the Border (November 2017)

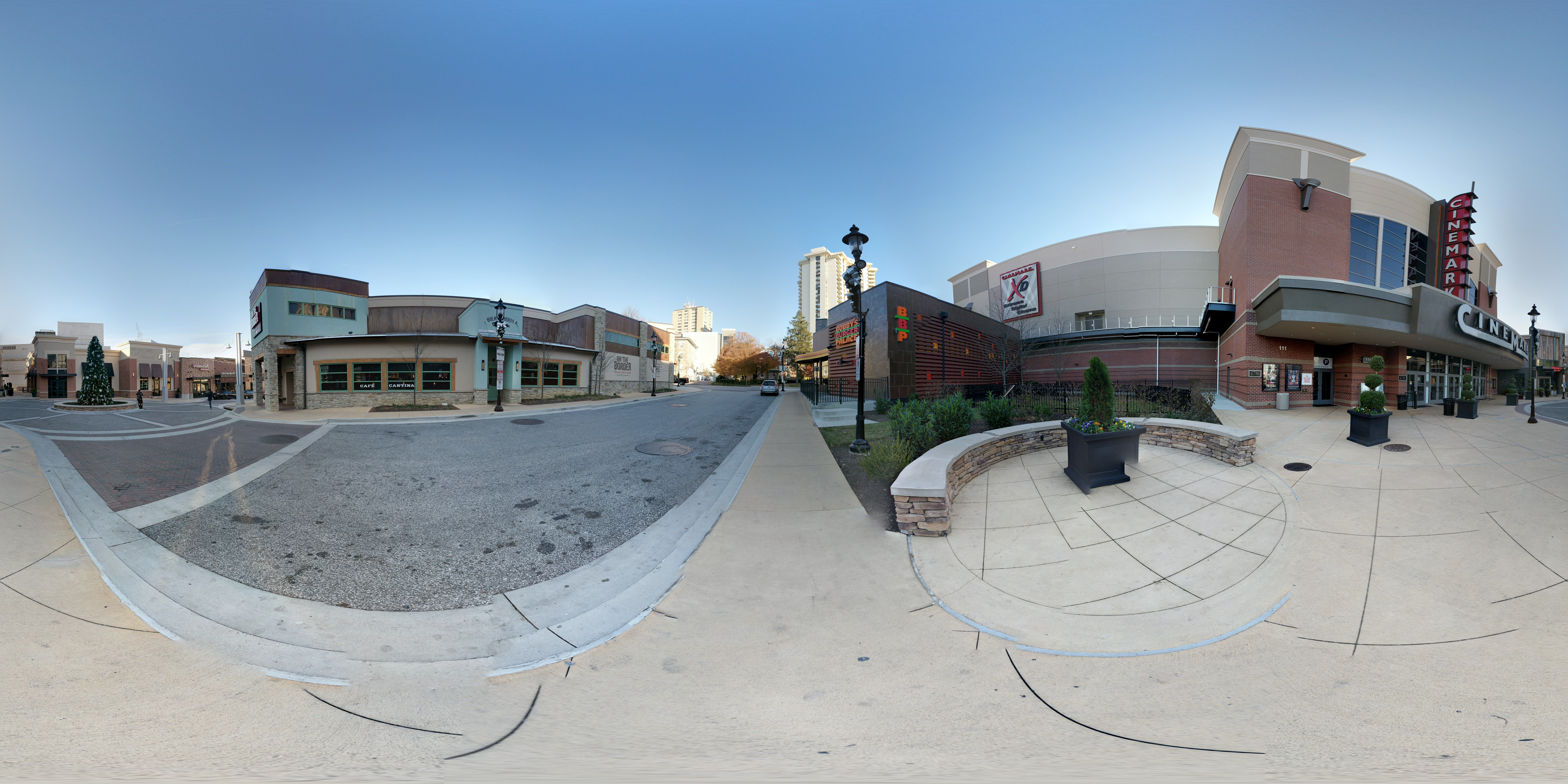
Spherical shot of Towson Square (November 2017)

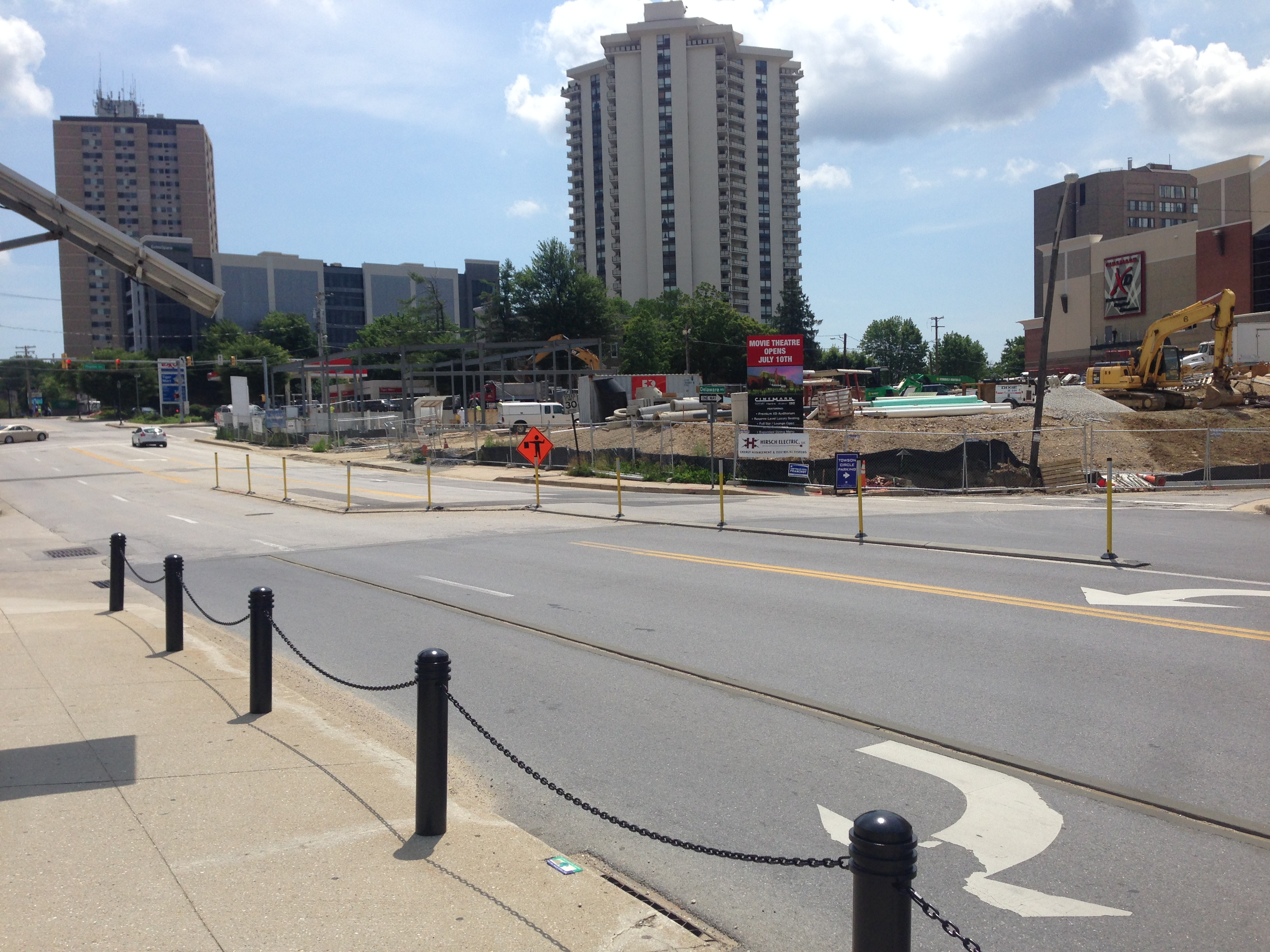
Towson Square under construction (June 2014)

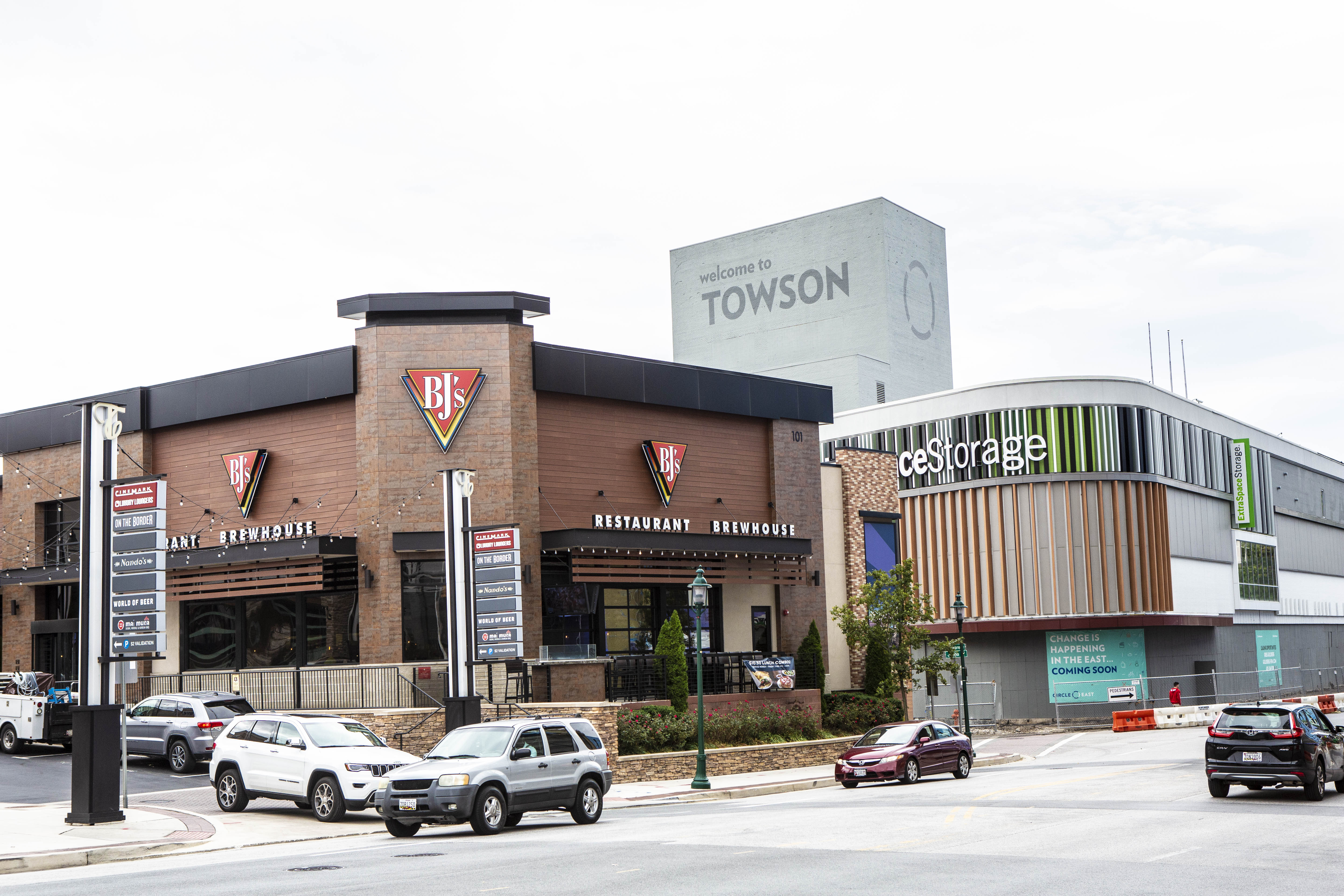
Circle East under construction, BJ's Restaurant & Brewhouse (October 2019)

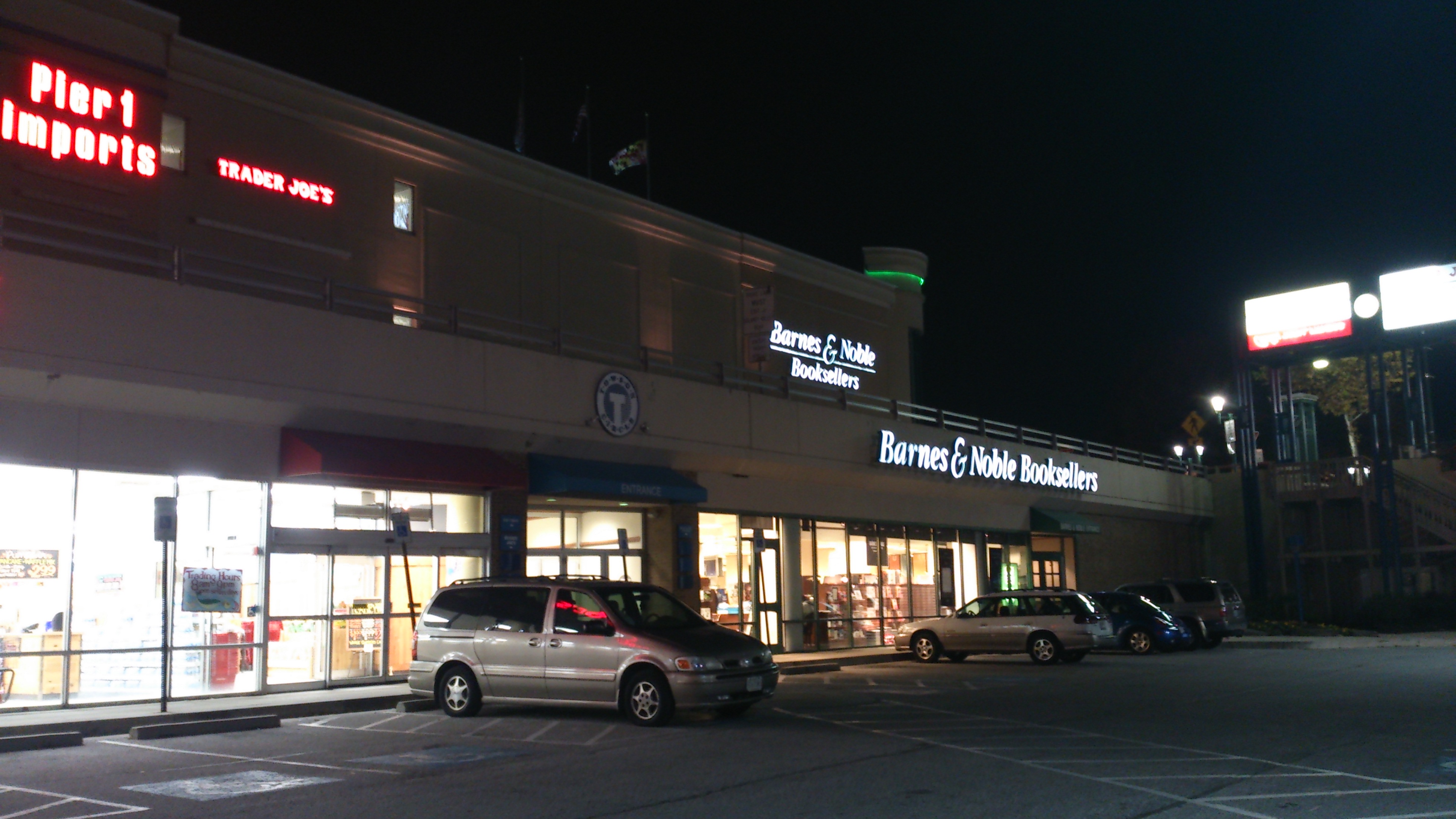
Towson Circle at night (November 2013)

== See also ==
- The Shops at Canton Crossing
- Rainbow Centre Factory Outlet
- White Marsh Town Center
