= White Marsh Mall =

Shopping mall in Baltimore County, Maryland, U.S.

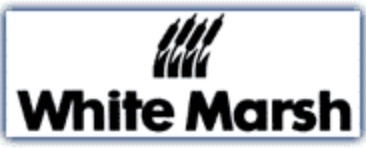

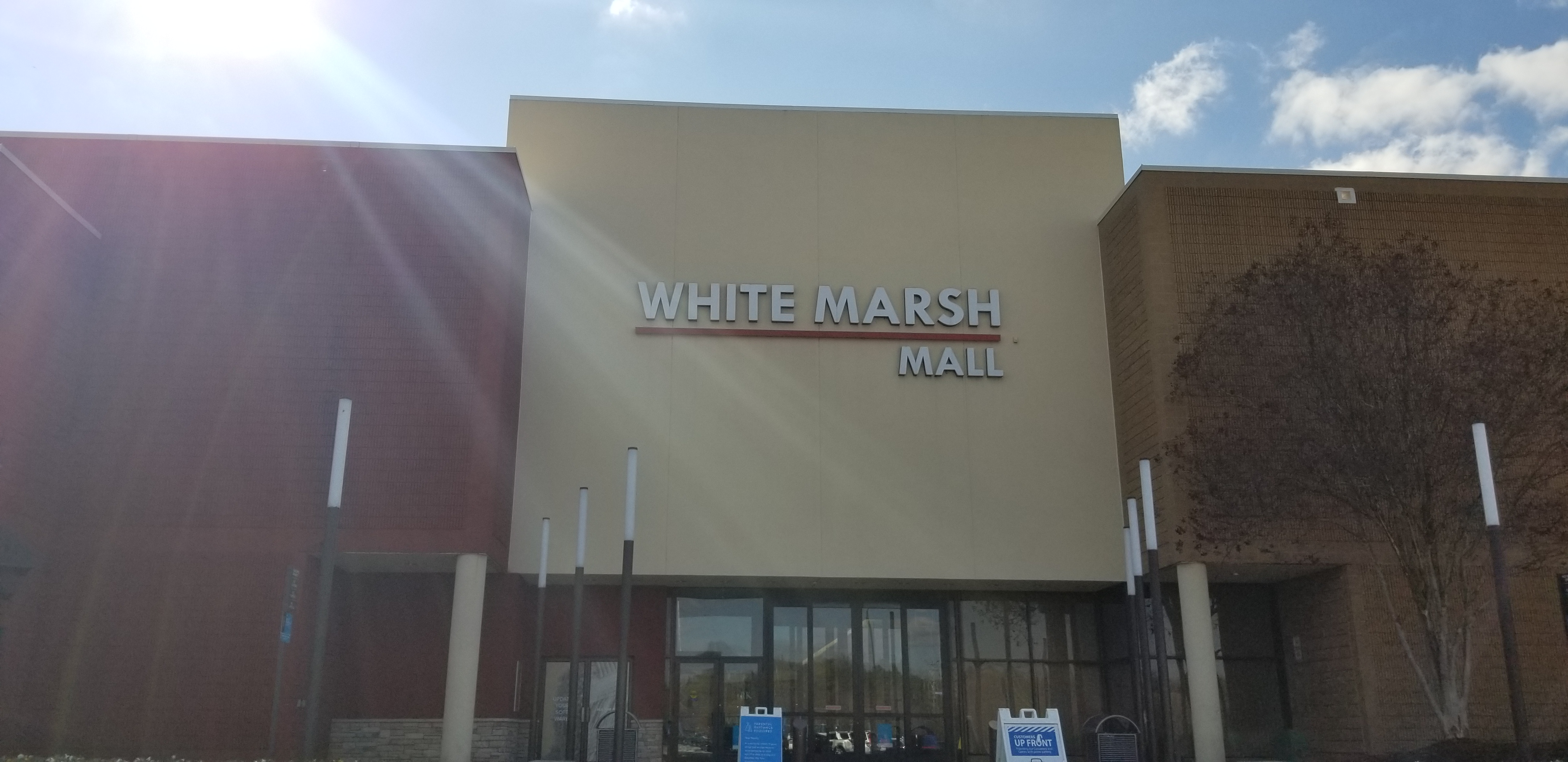
- Main entrance (February 2020)
- Location: White Marsh, Maryland, United States
- Coordinates: 39.375°N 76.4675°W
- Address: 8200 Perry Hall Blvd, Baltimore, MD 21236
- Opened: August 12, 1981; 45 years ago
- Renovated: 2011–2013 (food court); 2024–2026 (food court entrance)
- Developer: The Rouse Company
- Manager: Spinoso Real Estate Group
- Owner: Spinoso Real Estate Group (White Marsh Mall); COPT Defense Properties (land)
- Architect: RTKL Associates
- Num. of stores: 130+
- Num. of anchor tenants: 6 (5 open, 1 vacant)
- Floor area: 1,200,000 square feet (110,000 m^{2})
- Floors: 2 (1 in Dave and Buster's and Macy's Home Store)
- Parking: Parking lot with 6,800 free spaces
- Public transit: MTA Maryland bus: 56, 120 at mall MTA Maryland bus: 56, 120, 411, 420, CityLink Brown at White Marsh Park & Ride
- Website: www.whitemarshmall.com
- Building details
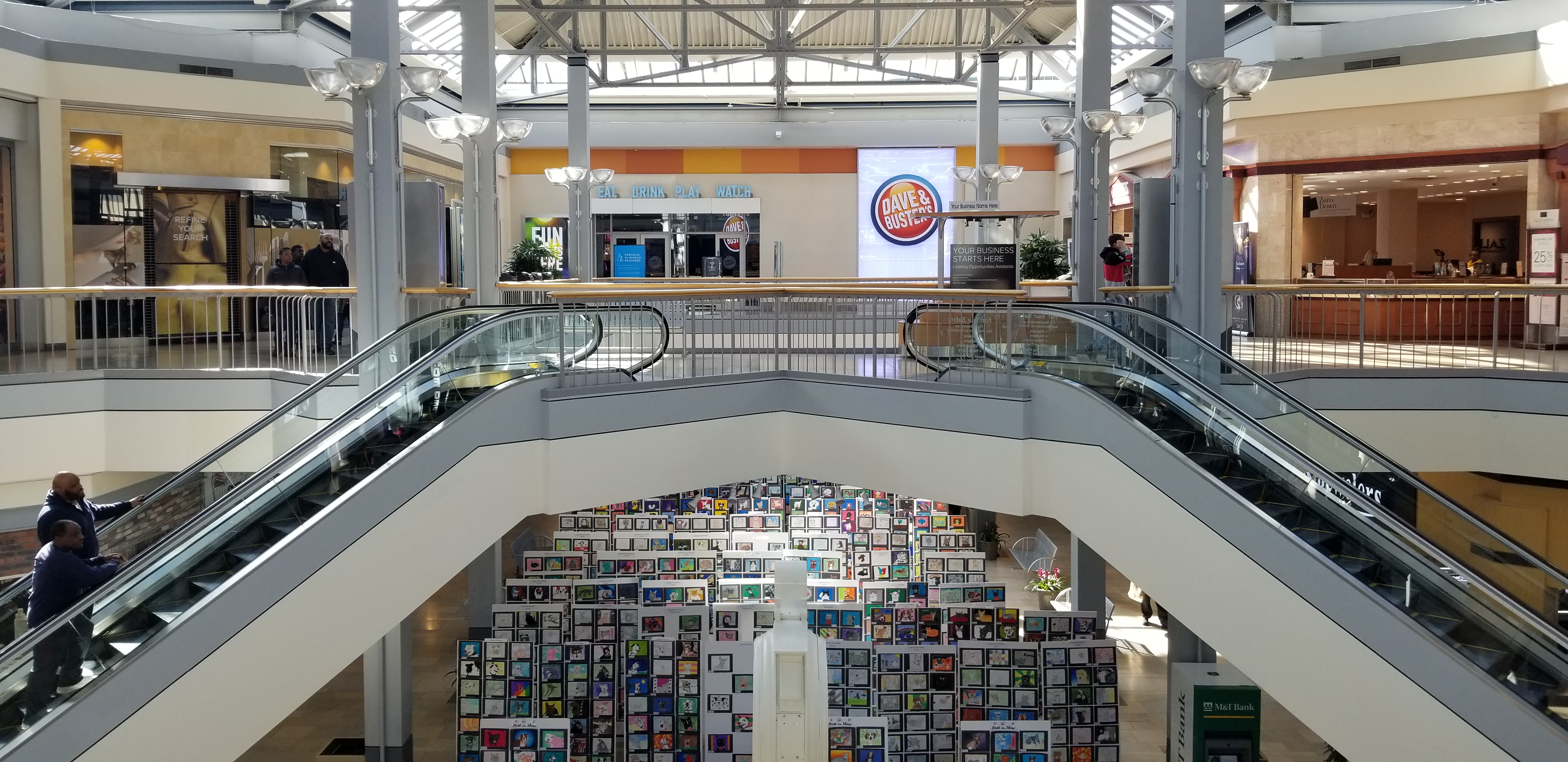
- Center court (February 2020)

General information
- Status: Operational

Design and construction
- Main contractor: Henry C. Beck Contractors

Renovating team
- Renovating firm: General Growth Properties (2011–2013)

White Marsh Mall is a super-regional shopping mall in the unincorporated and planned community of White Marsh, Maryland. It is one of the largest malls in the Baltimore metropolitan area, with six anchor stores and 130+ specialty shops in 1,200,000 square feet (110,000 m^{2}). The mall is anchored by Macy's (including Macy's Home Store), Boscov's, JCPenney and Dave & Buster's. It was developed by Rouse on land rented from Nottingham Properties.

White Marsh Mall is the fourth largest mall in the Baltimore metropolitan area, behind Towson Town Center, Arundel Mills and Annapolis Mall. It is adjacent to an IKEA store and The Avenue at White Marsh shopping center (as it is part of the broader White Marsh Town Center project). The mall is owned and managed by the Spinoso Real Estate Group, which acquired the mall from Brookfield Properties in November 2024.

== History ==
=== 1972–1998: Development, opening, and early operations ===
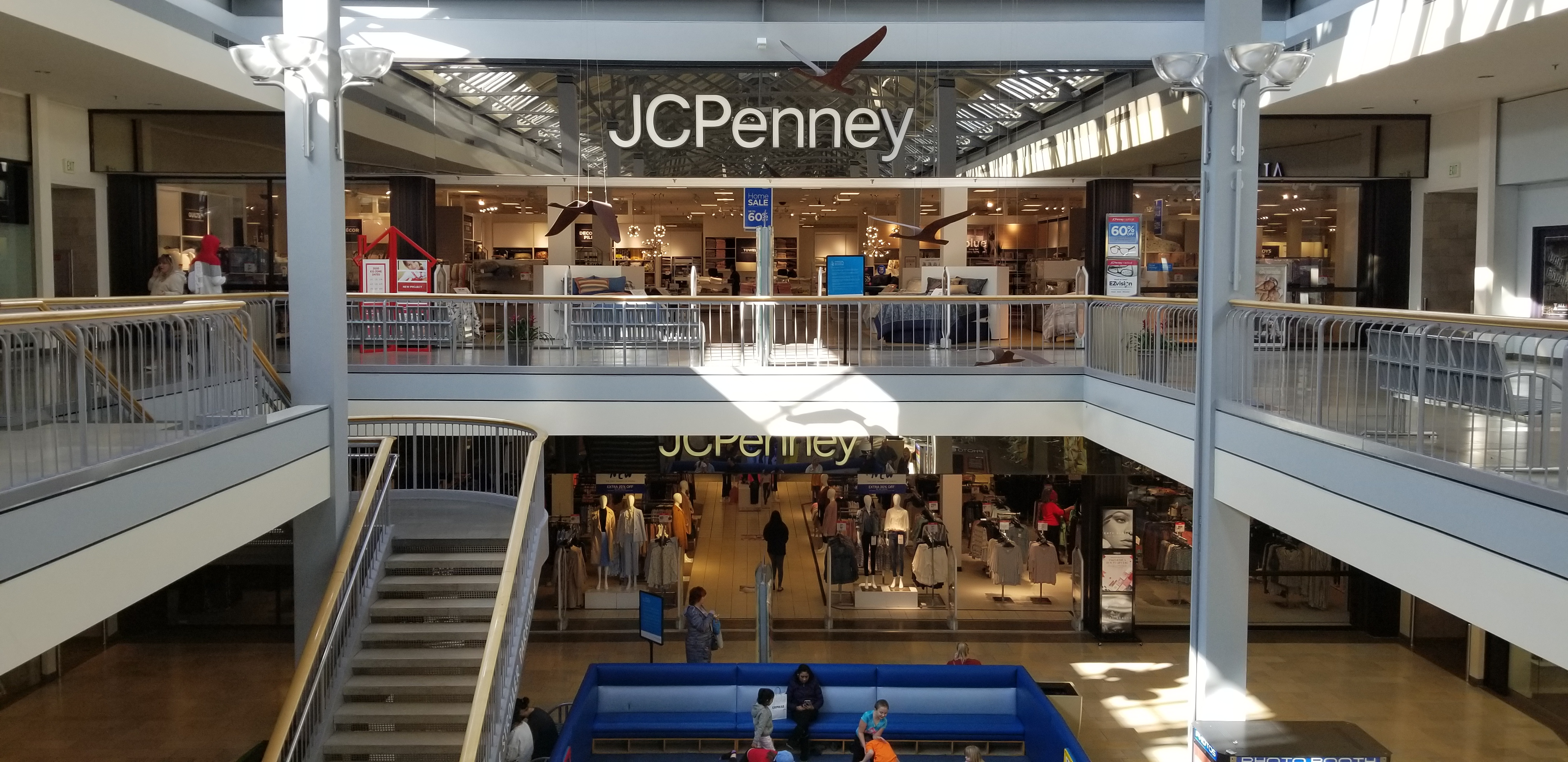
JCPenney wing (February 2020)

In 1972, Nottingham Properties began master planning for a 2,000-acre (810 ha) community called the White Marsh Town Center, forming a partnership with the Rouse Company of Baltimore to develop and own a super-regional shopping mall on land rented from Nottingham. In July 1973, Sears committed as an anchor store. Rouse formed the affiliate White Marsh Mall, LLC for the mall's development, and RTKL Associates, Inc. was chosen as the architect.

The center of the mall was constructed directly over a massive 40-foot-deep sand pit that needed to be filled and packed for structural stabilization. In 1981, most stores opened, with Bamberger's, JCPenney, Woodward & Lothrop, Hutzler's, and Sears as the original anchors. In October 1986, all Bamberger's locations rebranded to R.H. Macy & Company (later Macy's), including the White Marsh Mall location.

==== Macy's vs. Hecht's ====
In January 1990, Hutzler's closed permanently as the chain went out of business due to declining performance. In 1991, Hecht's announced that it would replace the anchor space left by Hutzler's, but this was stalled when on September 17 of that year, Macy's filed a lawsuit against the Rouse Co. and the May Department Stores Company (the owner of Hecht's) specifically to block Hecht's from opening, as at the time, Hecht's was a direct competitor to Macy's, and Hecht's having a location at the same mall would create cannibalization. Macy's argued that the original 1980 Reciprocal Easement Agreement (REA) gave each of the mall's original five anchors the right to consent to any changes in the occupation or expansion of the other anchor spaces until 1996. However, The Rouse Co. and May Co. had negotiated to place Hecht's in the former Hutzler's space—and planned to expand the building's footprint—without Macy's formal approval.

Hecht's managed to open in 1992, and on February 10, 1995, the Maryland Court of Appeals ultimately ruled against Macy's, finding that Macy's had "unreasonably withheld" its consent and that blocking a new tenant from a vacant space constituted an "unreasonable restraint on alienation" of the property. Hecht's was allowed to remain and expand, and Macy's was denied any monetary damages. On September 17, 1998, Lord & Taylor had its grand opening, becoming Baltimore's first L&T and taking over what was previously the mall's Woodward & Lothrop (informally "Woodies") store.

=== 2004–2018: General Growth Properties ===
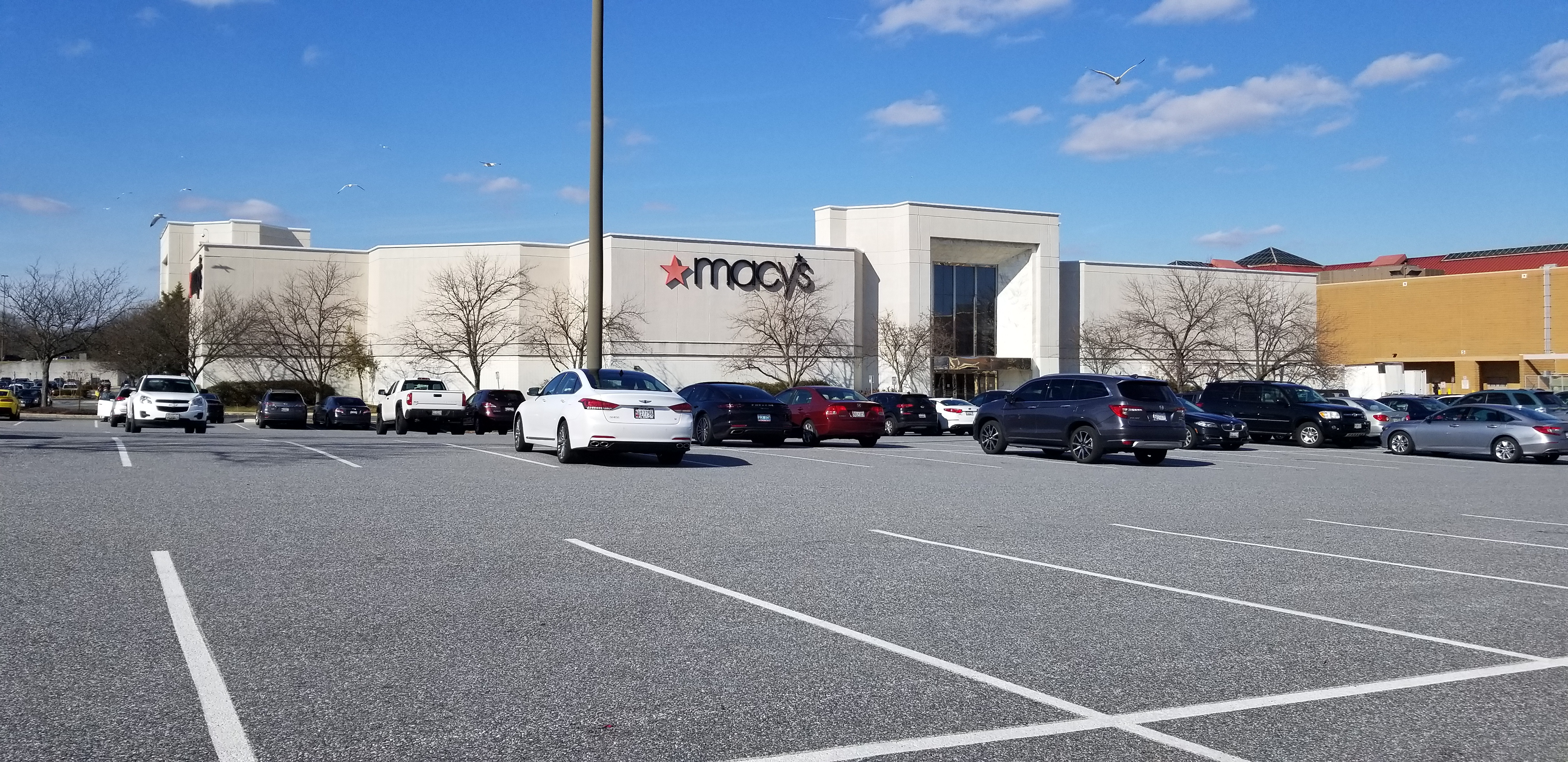
Exterior view of Hecht's / Macy's (February 2020)

In 2004, Lord & Taylor repositioned and shuttered entirely after only six years in operation, alongside the closure of the Owings Mills Mall location. In November of that year, the Chicago, Illinois-based General Growth Properties (GGP) acquired the Rouse Co. and its assets for $12.6 billion, including White Marsh Mall. The former L&T was converted into a Hecht's Home Store. In September 2006, Federated Department Stores acquired Hecht's, and announced that it would convert every remaining Hecht's location into Macy's. However, since the mall would then have two Macy's locations, and Federated owned Macy's since 1994, the original Macy's closed and was immediately replaced by Boscov's in February, while the Hecht's and Hecht's Home Store were converted to Macy's and Macy's Home, respectively.

However, Boscov's filed for Chapter 11 bankruptcy protection in August 2008, and announced that it would close ten stores, including White Marsh Mall. On February 16, 2010, the 197,000 sq ft (18,300 m^{2}) space was leased to Forever 21, but ultimately never moved into the former spot after Boscov's announced in May 2012 that it would reopen at around October after emerging from bankruptcy.

In August 2011, White Marsh Mall celebrated its 30th anniversary with a nugget-eating contest held by Chick-fil-A, a screening of Raiders of the Lost Ark at the mall's parking lot, and the appearance of the Aberdeen IronBirds mascot. On October 10 of that year, Red Robin Gourmet Burgers & Brews opened in the former 6,278 sq ft (583.2 m^{2}) spot of Fuddruckers, which was evicted by GGP alongside Ruby Tuesday as part of a major food court renovation. On January 22, 2013, Buca di Beppo took over a 6,944 sq ft (645.1 m^{2}) lower-level space near the food court that previously housed local vendor Lin's China Buffet. The former, 6,300 sq ft (590 m^{2}) Ruby Tuesday space was taken over by The Greene Turtle Sports Bar & Grille, which opened on March 13, 2013. In May of that year, Sleep Number relocated to a 2,275 sq ft (211.4 m^{2}) space on the upper level outside Macy's, and the mall expanded its Sunday hours.

On August 10, 2013, Forever 21 opened a "bigger and better" 14,500 sq ft (1,350 m^{2}) storefront located at the lower level near Sears. In the summer of 2016, Sports Authority, having been a tenant at White Marsh Mall since 2004, filed for Chapter 7 bankruptcy, which was previously Chapter 11 in March 2016 after failing to find a new buyer, and announced that it would liquidate its remaining 463 locations, including White Marsh Mall. The space remained vacant for nearly a year, and it was later replaced by Dave & Buster's, which announced that it would take over the 50,000 sq ft (4,600 m^{2}) space in June 2017 and opened on December 5 of that year.

In August 2018, White Marsh Mall was acquired by Brookfield Properties of New York City following its acquisition of GGP and its assets.

=== 2020–2023: Brookfield Properties ===
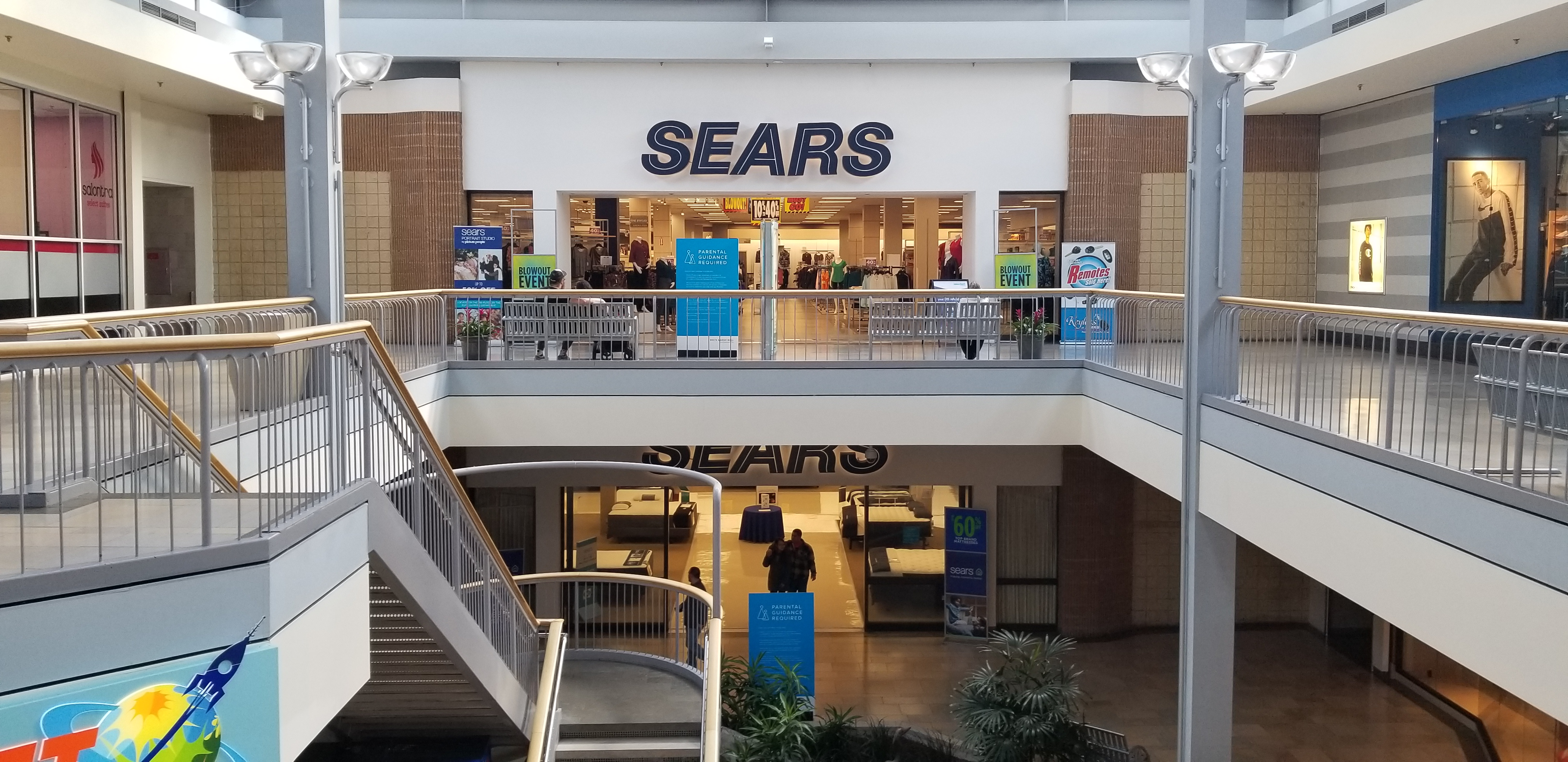
Interior view of the Sears wing while it undergoing liquidation (February 2020)

White Marsh Mall's initial struggles began when the COVID-19 pandemic happened. Sears announced in February 2020 that its store would close as part of a broader, nationwide effort by parent company Transformco to pare down its retail footprint due to years of declining sales, intense competition, and a struggling brick-and-mortar retail environment.

In March 2021, the Disney Store closed its doors, as The Walt Disney Company announced that it would be closing at least 60 stores in North America, two of them being Maryland stores per its location website: this one at White Marsh Mall, and the other at Arundel Mills. Disney cited the pandemic and a move from physical retail to its shopDisney e-commerce platform as the reason for the mass closures.

The property's debt issues began when the loan transferred to special servicing in August 2020 for imminent monetary default. Additionally, Brookfield failed to pay off the loan by its original maturity date in May 2021. By July 2024, the mall's appraised value had plummeted to $80 million, a 73% decrease from its $300 million valuation in 2013. As a result, Brookfield Properties was evicted as the owner and manager, and White Marsh Mall entered a court-appointed receivership in January 2023 due to mounting debt and financial distress.

=== 2023–present: Spinoso Real Estate Group ===
As of December 2022, it has been proposed to add 450 market rate apartments on the parcel of the former Sears, which will be demolished. The apartment development is expected to be constructed in phases. The entire apartment complex when completed will span almost 14 acres (5.7 ha) on the mall grounds. The plan has faced criticism regarding traffic congestion and school overcrowding in late March 2023.

In December 2023, both Red Robin and The Greene Turtle abruptly closed permanently, with Red Robin posting a note on the entrance doors saying the closure was "temporary" even though it ultimately never reopened (Buca di Beppo also left without announcement). The defunct Red Robin space was announced to be replaced by The Original Pancake House in late 2024.

On November 26, 2024, Spinoso Real Estate Group purchased the mall property out of receivership for $190 million; by then, management temporarily closed the food court entrance to undergo another renovation. The Original Pancake House opened on April 10, 2025, while Kanji Sushi All You Can Eat opened in the former Greene Turtle space in July of that year. On March 10, 2026, White Marsh Mall held a meeting regarding security concerns involving juvenile disturbance from several teenagers who were arrested.

In August 2026, the mall celebrated its 45th anniversary with the return of local entertainment icon Miss Kitty and commemorative White Marsh Mall frisbees and miniature bundt cakes provided by local-based Nothing Bundt Cakes to the first 450 attendees.

== Gallery ==
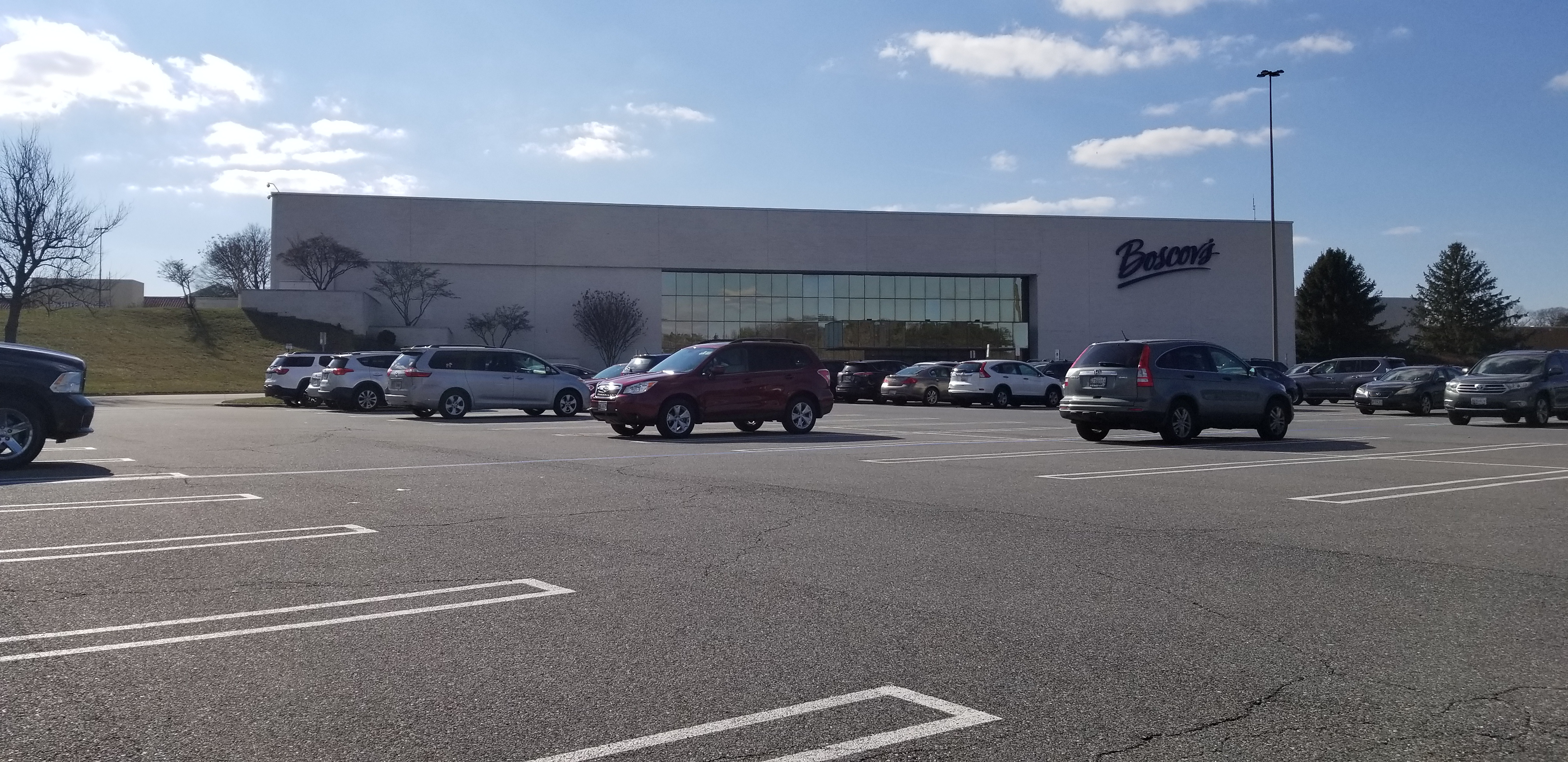
Exterior view of Boscov's / original Macy's building (February 2020)

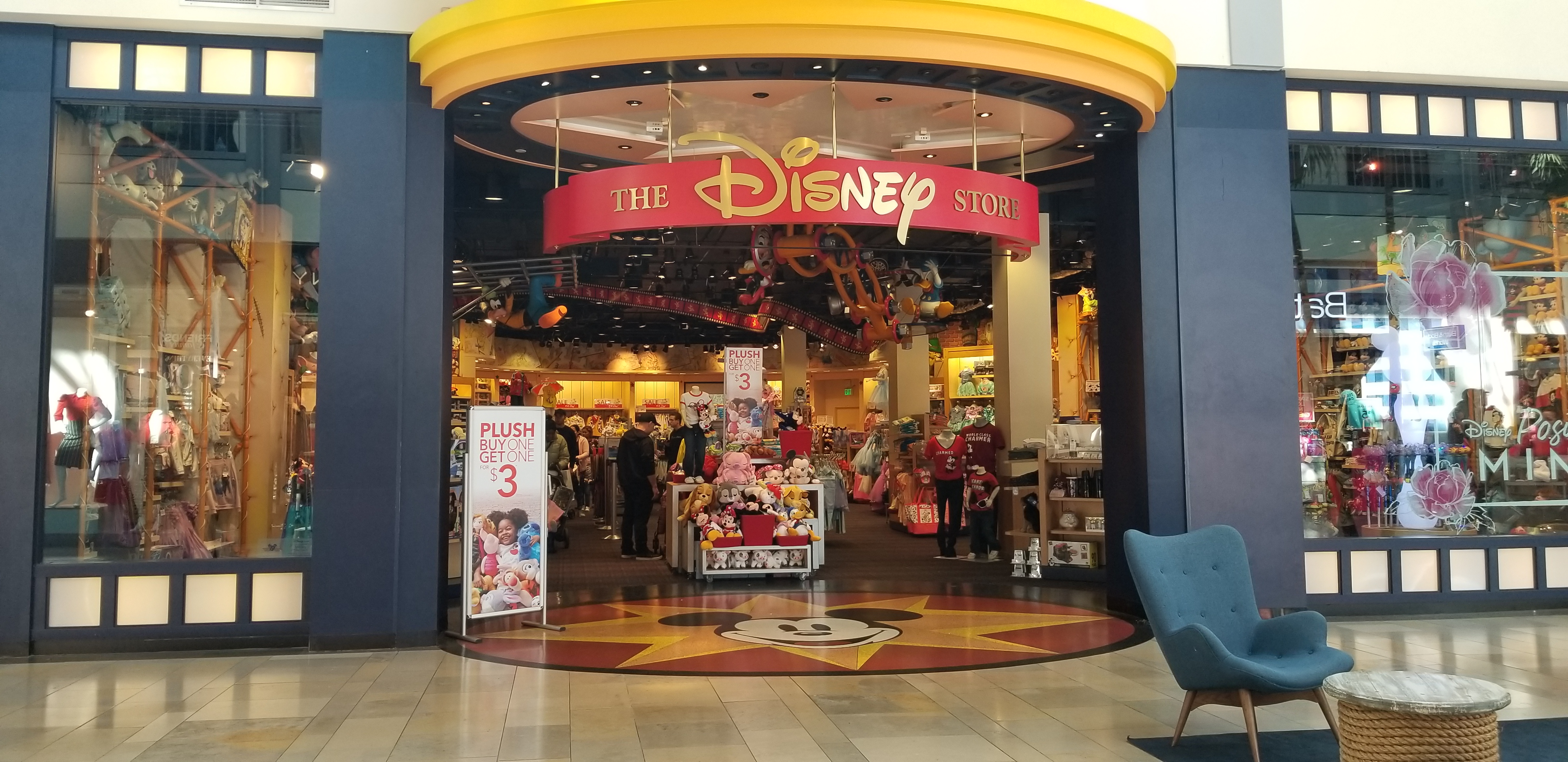
Disney Store (February 2020)

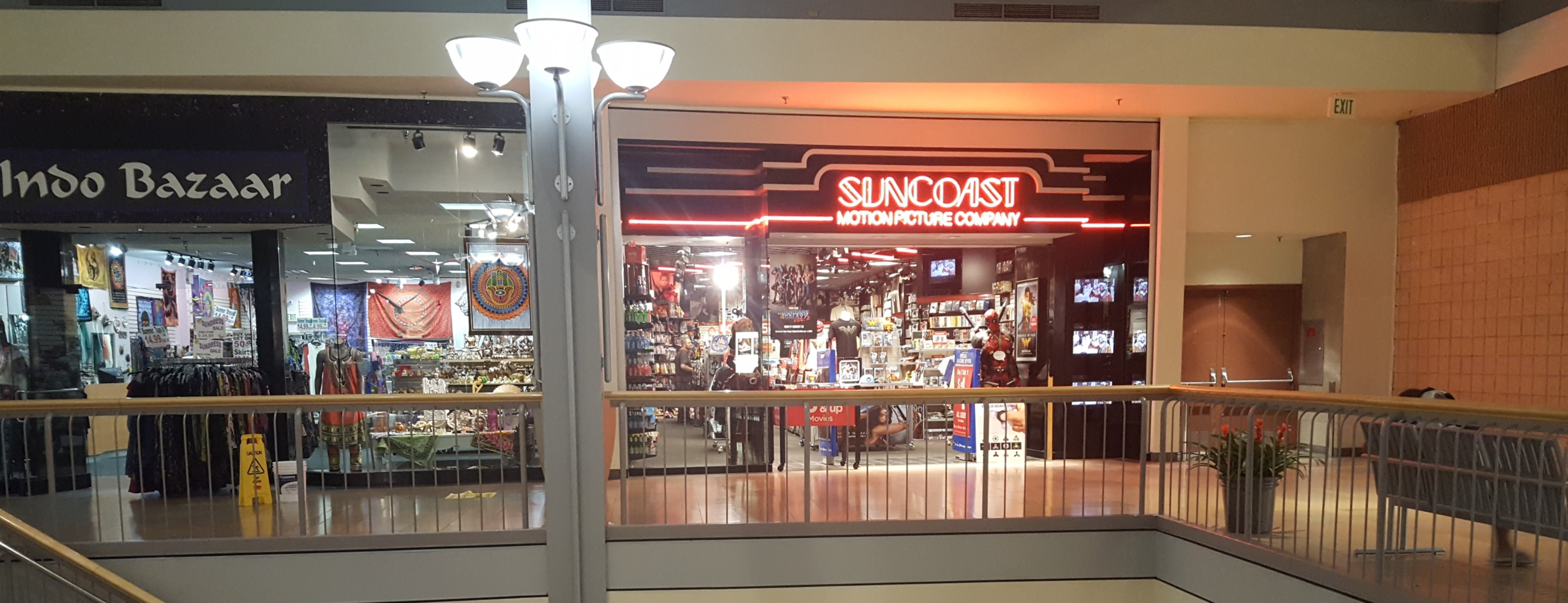
Suncoast Motion Picture Company (August 2017)

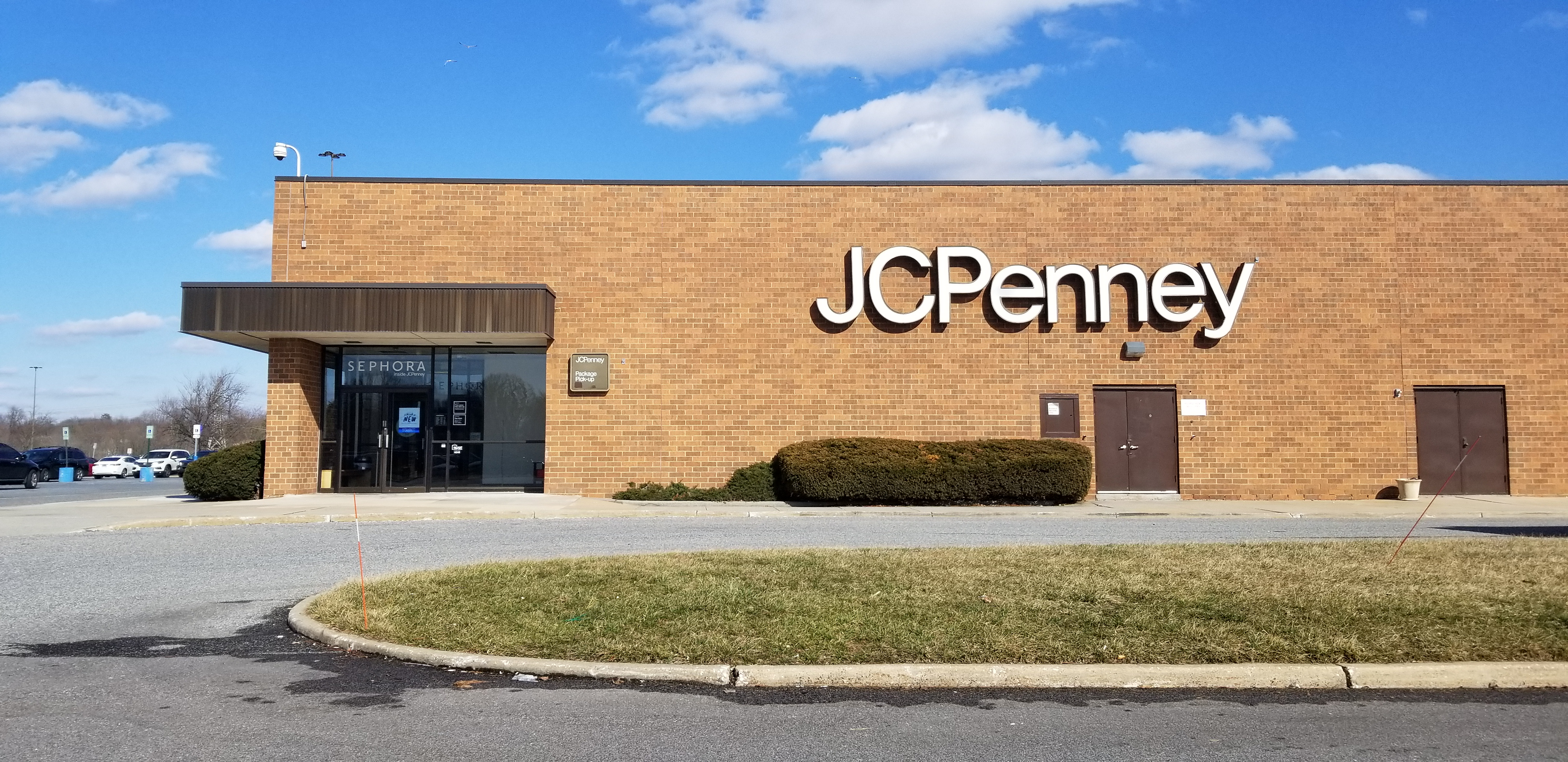
Exterior view of JCPenney (February 2020)

== See also ==
- The Shops at Canton Crossing
- Burlington Center
- Collin Creek Mall
- Harborplace
- The Mall in Columbia
