= James F. Ports Jr. =

American politician

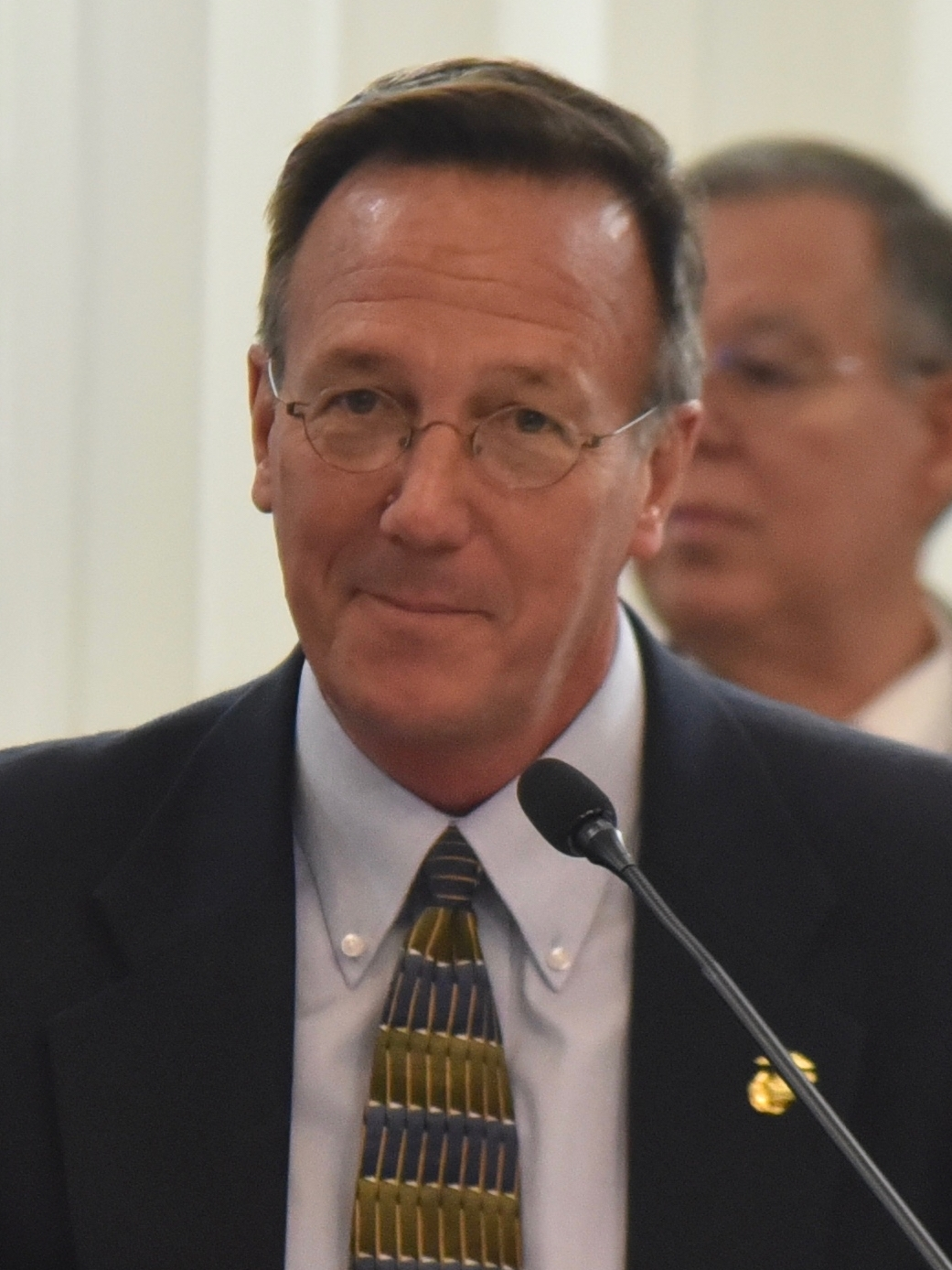
- Ports in 2019

Secretary of Transportation of Maryland
- In office January 11, 2022 – January 25, 2023
- Governor: Larry Hogan
- Preceded by: Gregory I. Slater
- Succeeded by: Paul Wiedefeld

Minority Whip of the Maryland House of Delegates
- In office December 18, 2001 – November 26, 2002
- Preceded by: Robert Flanagan
- Succeeded by: Kenneth D. Schisler

Member of the Maryland House of Delegates from the 8th district
- In office January 9, 1991 – January 8, 2003
- Preceded by: William J. Burgess and Donna M. Felling
- Succeeded by: Joseph C. Boteler III & Eric M. Bromwell
- Constituency: Baltimore & Baltimore City

Personal details
- Born: December 1, 1958 (age 67) Baltimore, Maryland, U.S.
- Party: Republican
- Profession: Real Estate Consultant

James F. Ports Jr. (born December 1, 1958) is an American politician who was a member of the Maryland House of Delegates, representing District 8, which covered portions of Baltimore & Baltimore City in Maryland. He served alongside Democrat Kathy Klausmeier and Republican Alfred W. Redmer Jr. In 2002, Ports decided against running for reelection in the House of Delegates and decided instead to run for Baltimore County Council. He won the Republican primary election, but lost in the general election to Vincent J. Gardina.

== Education ==
Delegate Ports graduated from Perry Hall High School. After serving in the Marine Corps, Ports attended and graduated from Essex Community College, with his Associates of Arts Degree in 1989.

== Career ==
As previously mentioned Ports was in the United States Marine Corps. He attained the rank of Sergeant, and once received the Expeditionary Medal for Marine of the Month. He served from 1978 until 1982.

After serving in the military, Ports was a supervisor of Industrial and Commercial Gas Field Operations for Baltimore Gas and Electric Company. He is also licensed as a registered representative by the Financial Industry Regulatory Authority as an insurance agent.

In his community he served as Vice-President of the Northeast Fullerton Community Association, which he was a member from 1986 until 1990. He has been a member of the 8th District Republican Club since 1988. Ports was a member of the Baltimore County Republican Central Committee, serving from 1989 until 1990 and again from 2003 until 2006. He was once elected to be a delegate for the 2000 Republican Party National Convention.

Delegate Ports also is a member of the Rossville Democratic Association, the Taxpayers for Government Efficiency, the Essex Community College Alumni Association. Additionally, he is a member of the Competent Toastmasters, and the Phi Theta Kappa honorary fraternity. Delegate Ports is also an associate member of Lodge no. 76, of the Fraternal Order of Police. He was the Commander of the Perry Hall/White Marsh Post no. 11378, Veterans of Foreign Wars (VFW) from 1992 until 1994. He is a life member of the Parkville Memorial Post no. 9083. Finally, he is an honorary co-chair and co-founder of the Perry Hall High School Alumni Association.

Delegate Ports has received awards from People Against Child Abuse, the Maryland School for the Blind, the Baltimore County Police Department, and the Tall Cedars of Lebanon. In 1996, Delegate Ports was selected as Outstanding Young Marylander of the Year by the Maryland Jaycees. Additionally, he received the General James P. S. Devereux Award from the Maryland Society of the Sons of the American Revolution in 1997. Finally, Ports was awarded Legislator of the Year by the American Legislative Exchange Council (ALEC) in 2001.

== Legislative career ==
While a member of the Maryland House of Delegates, Ports was a member of the Constitutional and Administrative Law Committee from 1991 until 1992, the Ways and Means Committee from 1992 until 2003, the Joint Transportation Financing Committee in 1994, and the Special Joint Committee on Competitive Taxation and Economic Development from 1996 until 1997. Additionally, he served on the Joint Committee on the Selection of the State Treasurer in 2002, the Legislative Policy Committee from 2002 until 2003, and the Rules and Executive Nominations Committee from 2002 until 2003. Delegate Ports was also a member of the National Task Force on Energy, Environment, and Natural Resources, and with ALEC from 1991 until 2003, serving as vice-chair of the energy subcommittee. Ports served as Minority Whip from 2001 until 2002.

Delegate Ports originally made a name for himself when he fought against Baltimore County Executive C.A. Dutch Ruppersberger's property condemnation bill, which was ultimately defeated. The bill would have allowed the county to use eminent domain to seize waterfront property in Essex and redevelop it.

== Election results ==
- 1998 Race for Maryland House of Delegates – District 08

Voters to choose three:

Name	Votes	Percent	Outcome
Kathy Klausmeier, Dem.	19,835	21%	Won
Alfred W. Redmer Jr., Rep	17,846	19%	Won
James F. Ports Jr., Rep.	17,756	19%	Won
J. Joseph Curran III, Dem.	17,583	19%	Lost
Joseph C. Boteler III, Rep.	11,306	12%	Lost
Taras Andrew Vizzi, Dem.	9,927	11%	Lost

- 1994 Race for Maryland House of Delegates – District 08

Voters to choose three:

Name	Votes	Percent	Outcome
Kathy Klausmeier, Dem.	17,496	20%	Won
Alfred W. Redmer Jr., Rep.	14,876	18%	Won
James F. Ports Jr., Rep.	15,244	17%	Won
Calvin Clemons, Rep.	13,996	16%	Lost
Daniel E. McKew, Dem.	12,931	15%	Lost
John G. Disney, Dem.	11,886	14%	Lost

- 1990 Race for Maryland House of Delegates – District 08

Voters to choose three:

Name	Votes	Percent	Outcome
Alfred W. Redmer Jr., Rep.	15,354	18%	Won
Joseph Bartenfelder, Dem.	14,876	18%	Won
James F. Ports, Rep.	14,266	17%	Won
Kenneth G. Hirsch, Rep.	14,129	17%	Lost
Donna M. Felling, Dem.	13,006	15%	Lost
William J. Burgess, Dem.	12,680	15%	Lost
John Michael Fleig	20	0%	Lost
