= Alfred W. Redmer Jr. =

American politician

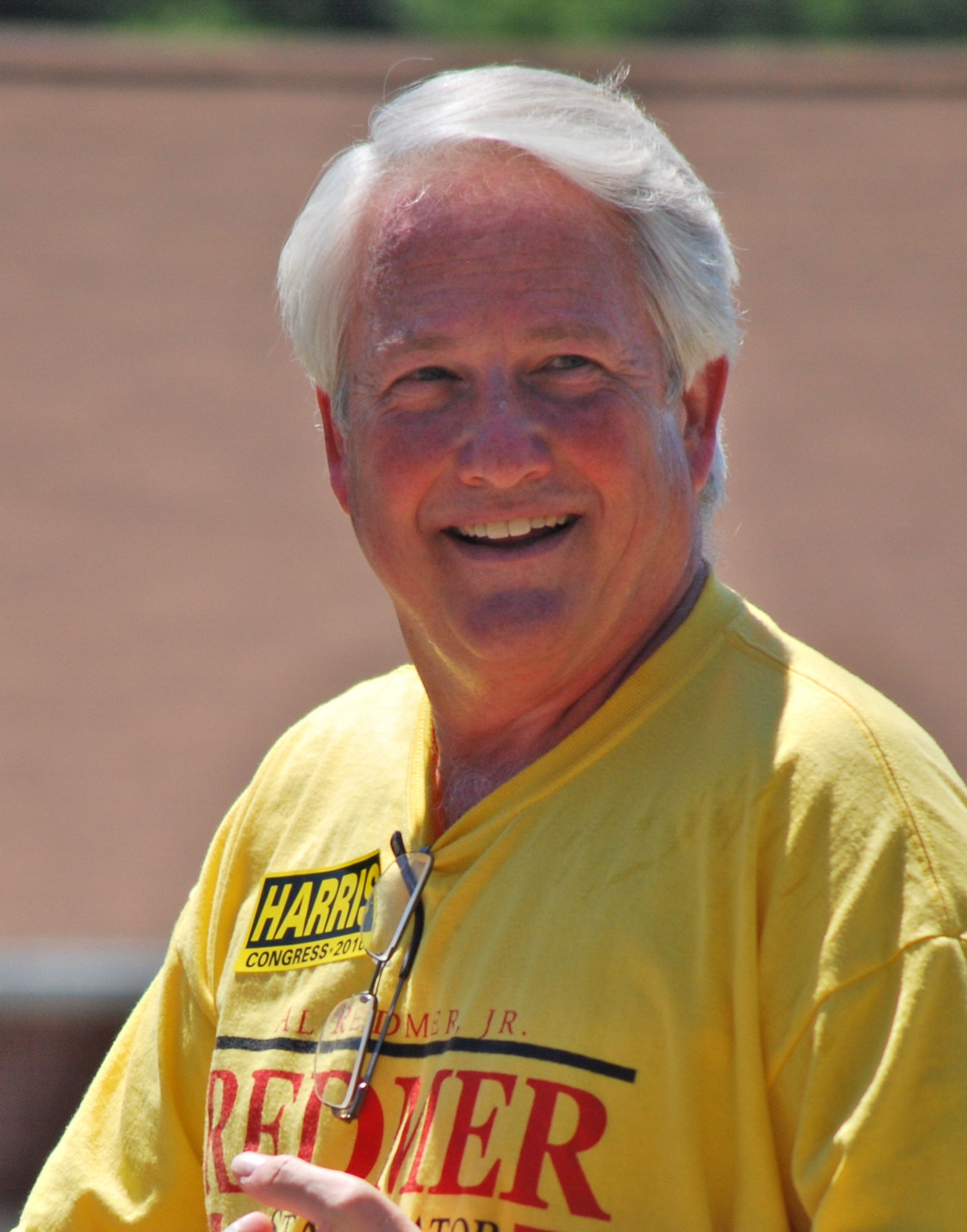
- Redmer in 2010

Maryland Insurance Commissioner
- In office January 21, 2015 – May, 2020
- Governor: Larry Hogan
- Deputy: Nancy S. Grodin
- Preceded by: Therese M. Goldsmith

Maryland Insurance Commissioner
- In office July 29, 2003 – 2005
- Governor: Bob Ehrlich
- Preceded by: Steven Larsen
- Succeeded by: James V. McMahan

Minority Leader of the Maryland House of Delegates
- In office December 18, 2001 – January 8, 2003
- Preceded by: Robert H. Kittleman
- Succeeded by: George C. Edwards

Member of the Maryland House of Delegates from the 8th district
- In office January 9, 1991 – May 31, 2003
- Preceded by: Donna M. Felling and William J. Burgess
- Succeeded by: John W. E. Cluster Jr.

Personal details
- Born: January 15, 1956 (age 70) Baltimore, Maryland, U.S.
- Party: Republican
- Spouse: Sandy Redmer
- Children: 5

Alfred W. Redmer Jr. (born January 15, 1956) was a Maryland Insurance Commissioner and was the Republican nominee for County Executive of Baltimore County, Maryland in 2018. He formerly served as a legislator in the Maryland House of Delegates, representing District 8 in Baltimore County, prior to being appointed Maryland Insurance Commissioner in 2003.

== Education ==
A lifelong resident of Baltimore County, Redmer graduated from Perry Hall High School, which is in Perry Hall, Maryland, a northeast area Baltimore suburb. After high school he attended The American College in Bryn Mawr, Pennsylvania. The American College is a college for life insurance underwriters.

== Career ==
After completing his education, Redmer founded Redmer Insurance & Investment Services. He was also the Marketing and public relations specialist for the Mather Companies. He was a trustee for the Council on Economic Education in Maryland.

=== Republican Party activities ===
Redmer was a member of the Republican State Central Committee for 9th District in Baltimore County from 1978 to 1982. He was the co-chair of Ronald Reagan's Presidential Campaign, 8th District, in 1980. He served on the campaign staff for U.S. Representative Helen D. Bentley in 1980 and again in 1982. He was elected as a delegate for the 2nd Congressional District for the 1988 Republican National Convention.

=== House of Delegates ===
Redmer was first elected to the Maryland House of Delegates in January 1990 to represent District 8 in Baltimore County, which covers the greater Parkville area. During his tenure in the House of Delegates, Redmer served as Minority Leader from 2001 to 2003. Additionally, he was a member of several committees, including: the Environmental Matters Committee from 1991 until 2003, the Special Joint Committee on Vehicle Emissions Inspection Program from 1995 to 1998, the Joint Legislative Task Force on Organ and Tissue Donations during 1997 and 1998, and the Joint Committee on Health Care Delivery and Financing from 1999 until 2003.

He served on the Legislative Policy Committee from 2001 to 2003, the Spending Affordability Committee from 2001 until 2003, the Rules and Executive Nominations Committee from 2002 to 2003, the Joint Committee on the Selection of the State Treasurer in 2002, and again in 2003, and finally the Health and Government Operations Committee.

=== Maryland Insurance Commissioner ===
In 2003, Redmer was appointed Maryland Insurance Commissioner by Governor Bob Ehrlich, resigning his seat in the House of Delegates. Redmer served in this position for two years before resigning to accept a position with Coventry Health Care, a health insurance company located in Delaware.

Redmer was appointed to a second term as Maryland Insurance Commissioner by Gov. Larry Hogan (R) in January 2015.

Kathleen A. Birrane was appointed Maryland Insurance Administration Commissioner May 2020 https://insurance.maryland.gov/AboutUs/Pages/Bio.aspx?Name=Birrane

=== Candidacy for Baltimore County Executive ===
Redmer was a candidate for County Executive of Baltimore County in the 2018 election. If elected, he would've been the first Republican County Executive in the heavily-Democratic county in 24 years. He was endorsed by Gov. Hogan in the Republican primary. Redmer stressed his close relationship to Maryland's Republican governor, saying "If you like Larry Hogan, I'm your guy". His campaign advertising called for new schools and improved discipline in schools, while opposing low-income Section 8 housing. He opposed Baltimore County being a sanctuary jurisdiction for illegal immigrants. Redmer pledged not to raise taxes and proposed consideration of a build-leaseback approach with private sector participation to finance the construction of replacements for three County high schools: Dulaney, Lansdowne, and Towson High School.

Redmer was defeated by Democrat Johnny Olszewski in the general election.

== Election results ==
- 2002 Race for Maryland House of Delegates – District 08

Voters to choose three:

Name	Votes	Percent	Outcome
Alfred W. Redmer Jr.	22,884	19.61%	Won
Eric M. Bromwell	20,314	17.41%	Won
Joseph C. Boteler III, Rep.	19,826	16.99%	Won
Mike Rupp	18,755	16.07%	Lost
Tim Caslin	18,553	15.90%	Lost
Todd Schuler	16,277	13.95%	Lost
Other Write-Ins	86	0.07%	Lost

- 1998 Race for Maryland House of Delegates – District 08

Voters to choose three:

Name	Votes	Percent	Outcome
Kathy Klausmeier, Dem.	19,835	21%	Won
Alfred W. Redmer Jr., Rep	17,846	19%	Won
James F. Ports Jr., Rep.	17,756	19%	Won
J. Joseph Curran III, Dem.	17,583	19%	Lost
Joseph C. Boteler III, Rep.	11,306	12%	Lost
Taras Andrew Vizzi, Dem.	9,927	11%	Lost

- 1994 Race for Maryland House of Delegates – District 08

Voters to choose three:

Name	Votes	Percent	Outcome
Kathy Klausmeier, Dem.	17,496	20%	Won
Alfred W. Redmer Jr., Rep.	14,876	18%	Won
James F. Ports Jr., Rep.	15,244	17%	Won
Calvin Clemons, Rep.	13,996	16%	Lost
Daniel E. McKew, Dem.	12,931	15%	Lost
John G. Disney, Dem.	11,886	14%	Lost

- 1990 Race for Maryland House of Delegates – District 08

Voters to choose three:

Name	Votes	Percent	Outcome
Alfred W. Redmer Jr., Rep.	15,354	18%	Won
Joseph Bartenfelder, Dem.	14,876	18%	Won
James F. Ports Jr., Rep.	14,266	17%	Won
Kenneth G. Hirsch, Rep.	14,129	17%	Lost
Donna M. Felling, Dem.	13,006	15%	Lost
William J. Burgess, Dem.	12,680	15%	Lost
John Michael Fleig	20	0%	Lost

- 1986 Race for Maryland House of Delegates – District 08

Voters to choose three:

Name	Votes	Percent	Outcome
Joseph Bartenfelder, Dem.	18,245	23%	Won
Donna M. Felling, Dem.	16,443	21%	Won
William J. Burgess, Dem.	16,049	20%	Won
Scott A. Sewell, Rep.	11,610	15%	Lost
Alfred W. Redmer Jr., Rep.	10,841	14%	Lost
Howard C. Harclerode, Rep.	5,782	7%	Lost
