= William J. Burgess =

American politician (died 1996)

Member of the Maryland House of Delegates from the 8th district
- In office 1983–1990 Serving with Dale Anderson, Joseph Bartenfelder, Donna M. Felling
- Preceded by: Louis L. DePazzo; Daniel J. Minnick Jr. Robert A. Staab
- Succeeded by: James F. Ports Jr. Alfred W. Redmer Jr.

Member of the Maryland House of Delegates from the 9th district
- In office 1979–1982 Serving with Thomas L. Bromwell and William Rush
- Succeeded by: Donald K. Hughes; Thomas B. Kernan; Martha Scanlan Klima

Personal details
- Born: Boston, Massachusetts, U.S.
- Died: September 25, 1996 (aged 76) Rosedale, Maryland, U.S.
- Party: Democratic
- Spouse: Essie E. Perry (m. 1950)
- Children: 3
- Education: Johns Hopkins University
- Occupation: Politician
- Military career
- Conflicts: World War II
- Awards: Air Medal; Distinguished Flying Cross

William J. Burgess (died September 25, 1996) was an American politician from Maryland. He served as a member of the Maryland House of Delegates, representing District 9 from 1979 to 1982 and representing District 8 from 1983 to 1990.

== Early life and education ==
William J. Burgess was born in Boston, Massachusetts. He attended high school in Boston.

Burgess graduated from Johns Hopkins University night school with a degree in electrical engineering.

== Career ==
Burgess served as a tail gunner on B-29s during World War II. He was a recipient of the Air Medal and the Distinguished Flying Cross. In total, he served in the armed forces for 12 years. After World War II, he moved to Baltimore.

Burgess worked for Martin Marietta for 33 years. He worked as a senior finance analyst.

Burgess was a Democrat. He served as a member of the Maryland House of Delegates, representing District 9, from 1979 to 1982. He then represented District 8 in the Maryland House of Delegates from 1983 to 1990. In 1990, Burgess was defeated in re-election for the Maryland House of Delegates.

Burgess served five years as president of the Hillbrook Camelot Improvement Association and six years as president of the Greater Rosedale Community Council.

== Personal life ==
Burgess married Essie E. Perry in 1950. They had one son and two daughters, William J. III, Susan A. and Natalie E. Burgess died following heart problems on September 25, 1996, at the age of 76, at his home in Rosedale, Maryland.
