= Joseph C. Boteler III =

American politician

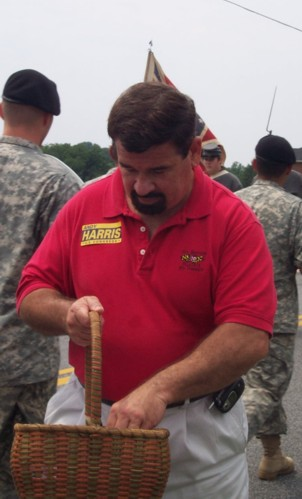
- Boteler in 2007

Member of the Maryland House of Delegates from the 8th district
- In office January 9, 2019 – January 11, 2023 Serving with Harry Bhandari (D), Carl W. Jackson (D)
- Preceded by: Christian Miele, Joe Cluster
- Succeeded by: Ryan Nawrocki
- In office January 8, 2003 – January 14, 2015
- Preceded by: James F. Ports Jr., Kathy Klausmeier
- Succeeded by: Christian Miele

Personal details
- Born: June 30, 1949 (age 77) Baltimore, Maryland, U.S.
- Party: Republican
- Spouse: Betty Boteler

Joseph C. Boteler III (born June 30, 1949) is an American politician who served as a member of the Maryland House of Delegates representing District 8 in Baltimore County, Maryland.

Boteler was first elected in 2002, serving alongside Alfred W. Redmer Jr. and Eric M. Bromwell. Redmer resigned in 2003 after being appointed Maryland Insurance Commissioner and was succeeded by John Cluster. In the 2006 election, Boteler was re-elected, serving with Bromwell and Todd Schuler.

== Career ==
Boteler has owned the company Print Solutions since 1999. He is a member of the Parkville Business and Professional Association, the Overlea Fullerton Business and Professional Association, and the Direct Marketing Association of Washington.

During his time in the Maryland House of Delegates, Boteler was nominated to serve as Deputy Minority Whip in 2007. He also served as co-chair of the Maryland Veterans Caucus and, beginning in 2005, was a member of the Charles Hickey Jr. School Advisory Board.

=== Legislative notes ===
- voted against the Clean Indoor Air Act of 2007 (HB359)
- voted against the Healthy Air Act in 2006 (SB154)
- voted for slots in 2005 (HB1361)
- voted against in-state tuition for illegal immigrants in 2007 (HB6)

== Election results ==
- 2010 Race for Maryland House of Delegates – District 08

Voters to choose three:

Name	Votes	Percent	Outcome
Joseph C. Boteler III	21,427	19.49%	Won
John Cluster	19,237	17.5%	Won
Eric M. Bromwell	18,966	17.25%	Won
Ruth Baisden	18,223	16.57%	Lost
Norman Secoura	16,267	14.79%	Lost
Cal Bowman	15,757	14.33%	Lost
Other Write-Ins	80	0.1%	Lost

- 2006 Race for Maryland House of Delegates – District 08

Voters to choose three:

Name	Votes	Percent	Outcome
Eric M. Bromwell	20,116	17.9%	Won
Joseph C. Boteler III	19,586	17.4%	Won
Todd Schuler	18,356	16.3%	Won
Ruth Baisden	18,261	16.2%	Lost
Melissa Redmer Mullahey	18,160	16.1%	Lost
John Cluster	18,057	16.0%	Lost
Other Write-Ins	74	0.1%	Lost

- 2002 Race for Maryland House of Delegates – District 08

Voters to choose three:

Name	Votes	Percent	Outcome
Alfred W. Redmer, Jr.	22,884	19.61%	Won
Eric M. Bromwell	20,314	17.41%	Won
Joseph C. Boteler III	19,826	16.99%	Won
Mike Rupp	18,755	16.07%	Lost
Tim Caslin	18,553	15.90%	Lost
Todd Schuler	16,277	13.95%	Lost
Other Write-Ins	86	0.07%	Lost

- 1998 Race for Maryland House of Delegates – District 08

Voters to choose three:

Name	Votes	Percent	Outcome
Kathy Klausmeier	19,835	21%	Won
Alfred W. Redmer Jr.	17,846	19%	Won
James F. Ports, Jr.	17,756	19%	Won
J. Joseph Curran III	17,583	19%	Lost
Joseph C. Boteler III	11,306	12%	Lost
Taras Andrew Vizzi	9,927	11%	Lost
