= Carl W. Jackson =

American politician (born 1984)

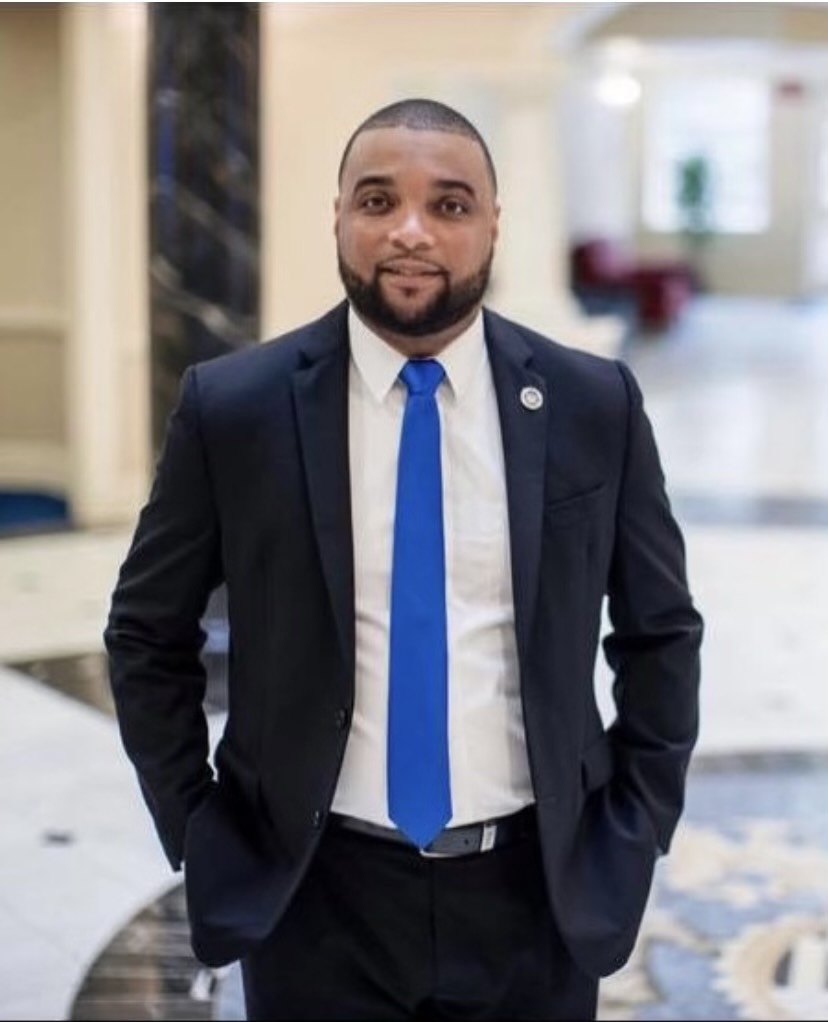
- Jackson in 2022

Member of the Maryland Senate from the 8th district
- Incumbent
- Assumed office February 5, 2025
- Appointed by: Wes Moore
- Preceded by: Kathy Klausmeier

Member of the Maryland House of Delegates from the 8th district
- In office October 21, 2019 – February 5, 2025 Serving with Harry Bhandari and Nick Allen
- Appointed by: Larry Hogan
- Preceded by: Eric M. Bromwell
- Succeeded by: Kim Ross

Personal details
- Born: October 27, 1984 (age 41) Baltimore, Maryland, U.S.
- Party: Democratic
- Children: 3
- Education: Strayer University (BS, MBA)
- Profession: Administrative analyst

Carl W. Jackson (born October 27, 1984) is an American politician who has served as a member of the Maryland Senate representing the 8th district since 2025. A member of the Democratic Party, he previously represented the district in the Maryland House of Delegates from 2019 to 2025.

== Background ==
Jackson was born in Baltimore, Maryland on October 27, 1984. He graduated from Overlea High School in Baltimore County, Maryland and attended Strayer University in Washington, D.C., where he earned a B.S. degree in business administration in 2008 and a M.B.A degree in 2017. He worked as an administrative analyst for the University of Maryland School of Social Work and served as a member of the University of Maryland, Baltimore County Staff Senate from 2014 to 2019.

Jackson was called to politics by President Barack Obama exhortation at the end of his second term that young people interested in making a change should run for office. He entertained his political appetite by volunteering for the campaign of Jon Ossoff in the 2017 Georgia's 6th congressional district special election.

Jackson was an unsuccessful candidate for the Maryland House of Delegates in District 8, a district that was seen as one of the swingiest of the state's swing districts. He prevailed in the Democratic primary, receiving 24.8 percent of the vote, but was defeated in the general election by a margin of 570 votes. After his election loss, he said that he was "so depressed he didn't know what to do." In December 2018, Baltimore County executive-elect Johnny Olszewski invited him to co-chair the public safety workgroup for his transition team and he also later joined the Baltimore County Pedestrian and Bicycle Committee at the suggestion of county councilwoman Cathy Bevins.

In September 2019, following the resignation of state delegate Eric M. Bromwell, who had resigned to take a job with the Baltimore County government, Jackson applied to fill his vacancy. His candidacy was endorsed by Olszewski, state senator Kathy Klausmeier, Bromwell, state delegate Harry Bhandari, and Bevins. In October 2019, Governor Larry Hogan appointed Jackson to the House of Delegates following the recommendations of the Baltimore County Democratic Central Committee.

== In the legislature ==
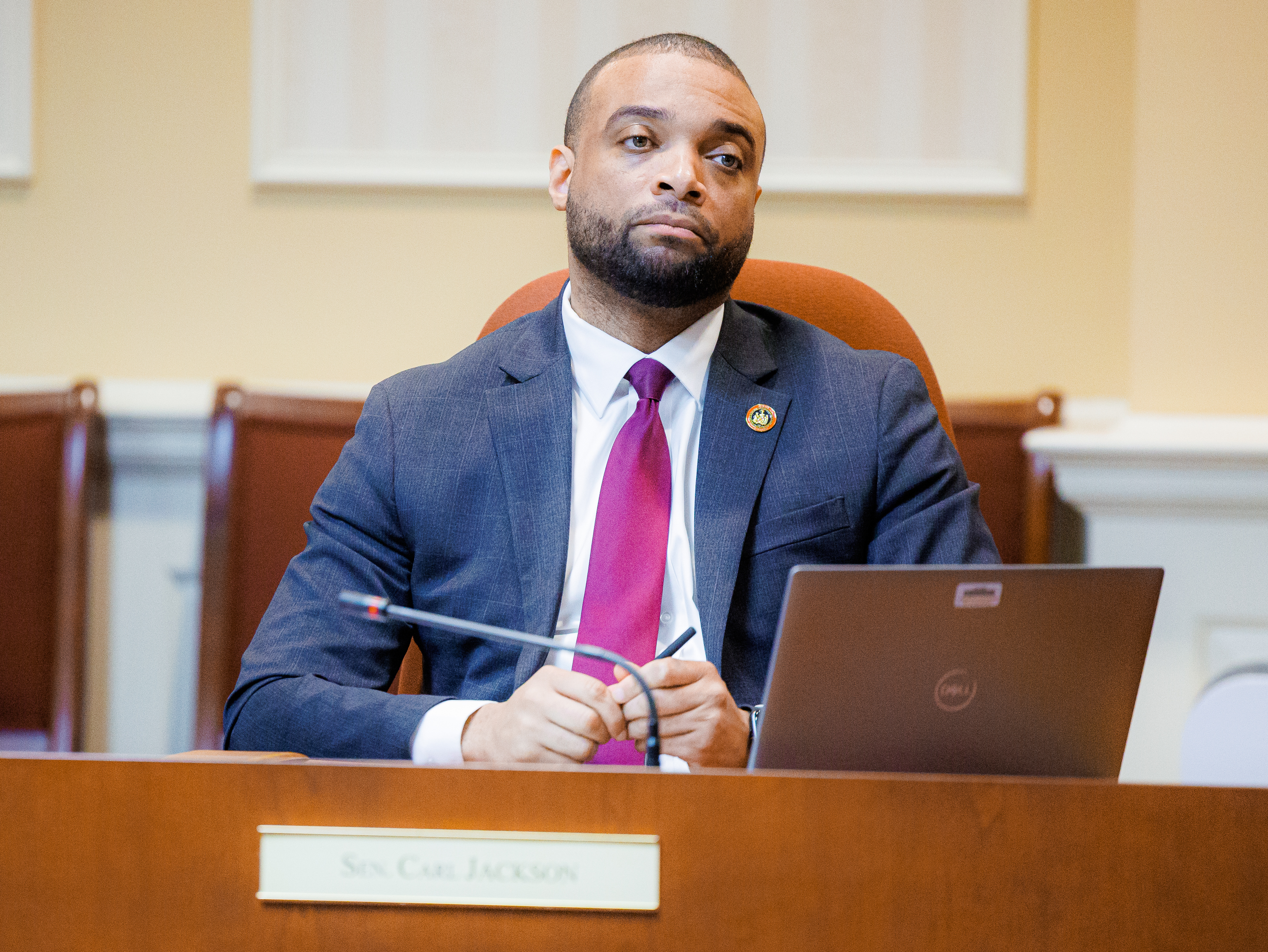
Jackson in the Senate Finance Committee, 2025

Jackson was sworn in on October 21, 2019, to fill a vacancy in District 8 of the Maryland House of Delegates. He is the first African-American legislator to represent the district. He was assigned to the House Economics Matters Committee and is a member of the Legislative Black Caucus of Maryland and the Legislative Transit Caucus.

In January 2025, after Klausmeier was elected Baltimore County Executive, Jackson told Maryland Matters that he would apply to fill the remainder of Klausmeier's term in the Maryland Senate. His candidacy was backed by U.S. representative Johnny Olszewski, state delegate Nick Allen, and multiple local labor unions. The Baltimore County Democratic Central Committee unanimously voted to nominate Jackson to the seat on January 28, 2025. He was appointed by Governor Wes Moore and sworn in on February 5, 2025, becoming the first African-American person to represent the 8th district in the Maryland Senate.

== Political positions ==
=== Crime ===
During the 2021 legislative session, Jackson introduced a bill that would make reporting false statements to police officers on the aspects of a person's identity a misdemeanor punishable under the state's hate crime statute by a $5,000 fine or three years of jail time. The bill passed the House of Delegates by a vote of 130–6.

In March 2026, during debate on a bill to repeal the practice of automatically charging youth as adults for certain crimes, Jackson was one of two Democrats to support a Republican amendment to the bill that would require youth charged with first-degree murder to be tried in adult courts. He voted against the bill on final passage.

=== Education ===
During the 2021 legislative session, Jackson a bill that would ban registered sex offenders from being students inside public schools. The bill passed and was signed into law by Governor Hogan on May 18, 2021.

During the 2022 legislative session, Jackson introduced a bill that would require schools to release air quality reports.

During the 2026 legislative session, Jackson introduced legislation that would expand the Baltimore County inspector general's oversight authority to include Baltimore County Public Schools.

=== Guns ===
In February 2020, Jackson joined six other Democrats in voting against legislation that would mandate background checks on private sales and transfers of shotguns and rifles.

=== Immigration ===
During the 2026 legislative session, Jackson was one of two Democratic state senators to vote against the Community Trust Act, which would require U.S. Immigration and Customs Enforcement to present a judicial warrant to hold someone and only allows for someone to be detained for ICE in a state or local correctional facility if the person was convicted of a felony, is a registered sex offender, served between 12 and 18 months in a state prison, or committed an offense in another state and served at least five years in prison.

=== Redistricting ===
In February 2026, Jackson said he opposed pursuing mid-decade redistricting in Maryland and opposed holding a vote on a bill that would redraw Maryland's congressional districts to improve the Democratic Party's chances of winning the 1st congressional district, the only congressional district held by Republicans in the state.

=== Taxes ===
In February 2021, Jackson joined eight other Democrats in voting against overriding a gubernatorial veto on a bill that would levy a tax on digital advertising on large tech companies.

== Electoral history ==
Maryland House of Delegates District 8 Democratic primary election, 2018
Party	Candidate	Votes	%
Democratic	Eric M. Bromwell (incumbent)	6,595	31.2
Democratic	Harry Bhandari	5,941	28.1
Democratic	Carl W. Jackson	5,246	24.8
Democratic	Joe Werner	3,335	15.8

Maryland House of Delegates District 8 election, 2018
Party	Candidate	Votes	%
Democratic	Eric Bromwell (incumbent)	22,485	18.0
Democratic	Harry Bhandari	22,094	17.7
Republican	Joseph C. Boteler III	20,802	16.7
Democratic	Carl Jackson	20,232	16.2
Republican	Joe Cluster (incumbent)	20,084	16.1
Republican	Joe Norman	18,898	15.2
Write-in		99	0.1

Maryland House of Delegates District 8 election, 2022
Party	Candidate	Votes	%
Democratic	Harry Bhandari (incumbent)	19,702	21.62
Democratic	Carl W. Jackson (incumbent)	18,950	20.79
Democratic	Nick Allen	18,062	19.82
Republican	Kathleen A. Smero	11,838	12.99
Republican	Timothy M. Neubauer	11,259	12.36
Republican	Glen Geelhaar	11,243	12.34
Write-in		74	0.08
