= Dale Anderson (politician) =

American politician (1916–1996)

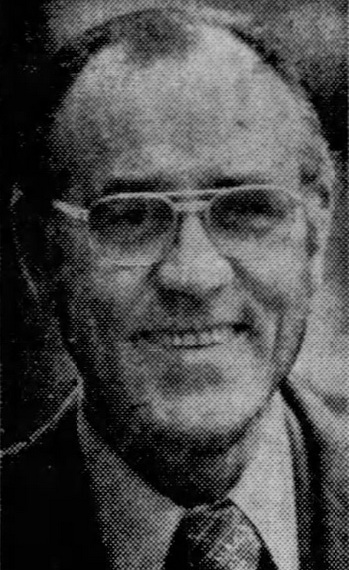
- Anderson in 1974

Member of the Maryland House of Delegates from the 8th district
- In office 1983–1987 Serving with Joseph Bartenfelder and William J. Burgess
- Preceded by: district renumbering
- Succeeded by: Donna M. Felling

4th Baltimore County Executive
- In office 1966–1974
- Preceded by: Spiro Agnew
- Succeeded by: Frederick L. Dewberry (acting)

Member of the Baltimore County Council from District 5
- In office 1958–1966

Personal details
- Born: Naaman Dale Anderson; November 9, 1916 Metropolis, Illinois, U.S.
- Died: July 27, 1996 (aged 79)
- Resting place: Stevensville Cemetery
- Party: Democratic
- Spouse: Dorothy E. Rassa
- Children: 2
- Profession: Real estate broker; builder

Military service
- Branch/service: United States Air Force
- Years of service: 1942–1946
- Rank: Captain

Naaman Dale Anderson (November 9, 1916 – July 27, 1996) was a Maryland politician who held several positions, including Baltimore County Councilman, Baltimore County Executive, and Maryland State Delegate. Anderson was convicted and sentenced to prison in 1974 for tax crimes, extortion, and conspiracy.

== Early life and education ==
Naaman Dale Anderson was born on November 9, 1916. Anderson attended Metropolis High School in Metropolis, Illinois.

After high school Anderson served in the military during World War II, eventually achieving the rank of captain. In 1963 he graduated with his Juris Doctor from the Mount Vernon Law School, which is now known as the University of Baltimore.

== Career ==
=== Early career ===
Anderson was a member of the Baltimore County Council from 1958 until 1966, when he was elected as the 4th County Executive, replacing Spiro Agnew, who later ran for and was elected as the Governor of Maryland.

While County Executive, Anderson was also a member of the Planning Board, the Recreation and Park Board, the Social Services Board, the Regional Planning Council, all from 1966 until 1974, and on the Governor's Commission on Law Enforcement and the Administration of Justice from 1967 until 1971.

In addition to his election positions, Dale Anderson also served as President of the Maryland Association of Counties in 1970 and was a member of the Democratic National Committee from 1970 until 1974.

=== Era of corruption ===
In March 1974, Dale Anderson was convicted in U.S. District Court on several counts, including 32 counts of extortion, tax evasion, and conspiracy. The trial lasted 10 weeks and centered on paybacks from contractors in exchange for contracts for state jobs. Anderson was sentenced to 5 years in prison, but only served a portion of that time.

The conviction came during a decade-long era in Maryland politics when several prominent politicians were forced to resign and some served prison sentences. This included former Maryland Governor and Vice President Spiro Agnew, who resigned the Vice Presidency amid allegations of accepting bribes during his tenure as governor, followed later by Maryland Governor Marvin Mandel's imprisonment for mail fraud and racketeering. Other Maryland politicians that were convicted of various crimes were Anne Arundel County Executive Joseph W. Alton, Baltimore County State's Attorney Samuel Green, Baltimore State Senator Clarence Mitchell III, Speaker of the House of Delegates A. Gordon Boone, U.S. Senator Daniel B. Brewster, and State Delegate James A. Scott.

=== Return to politics ===
After serving his prison sentence and remaining out of politics for a while Anderson returned in 1982 when he won election to the Maryland House of Delegates from District 8. He served from 1983 to 1986. He was defeated in his bid for re-nomination as a Democratic in the 1986 primary. While in the House of Delegates he served on the Constitutional and Administration Law Committee from 1983 to 1987, the Maryland Commission on Intergovernmental Cooperation from 1983 until 1985, and the Joint Committee of Federal Relations from 1985 until 1987.

== Personal life ==
Anderson married Dorothy "Doris" E. Rassa. He had a son and daughter, David Lee and Mindy. Anderson lived in Kent Island, Maryland.

Anderson died on July 27, 1996. He was buried at Stevensville Cemetery.

In 2023, Baltimore County officials installed plaques next to the portraits of Anderson and Agnew near the county executive's office in the Historic Courthouse. The plaques, researched by the Historical Society of Baltimore County, note their respective crimes.

Political offices
Preceded by Spiro Agnew	Baltimore County Executive; 1967–1974	Succeeded by Frederick L. Dewberry (acting)
