= Christian Miele =

American lawyer and politician

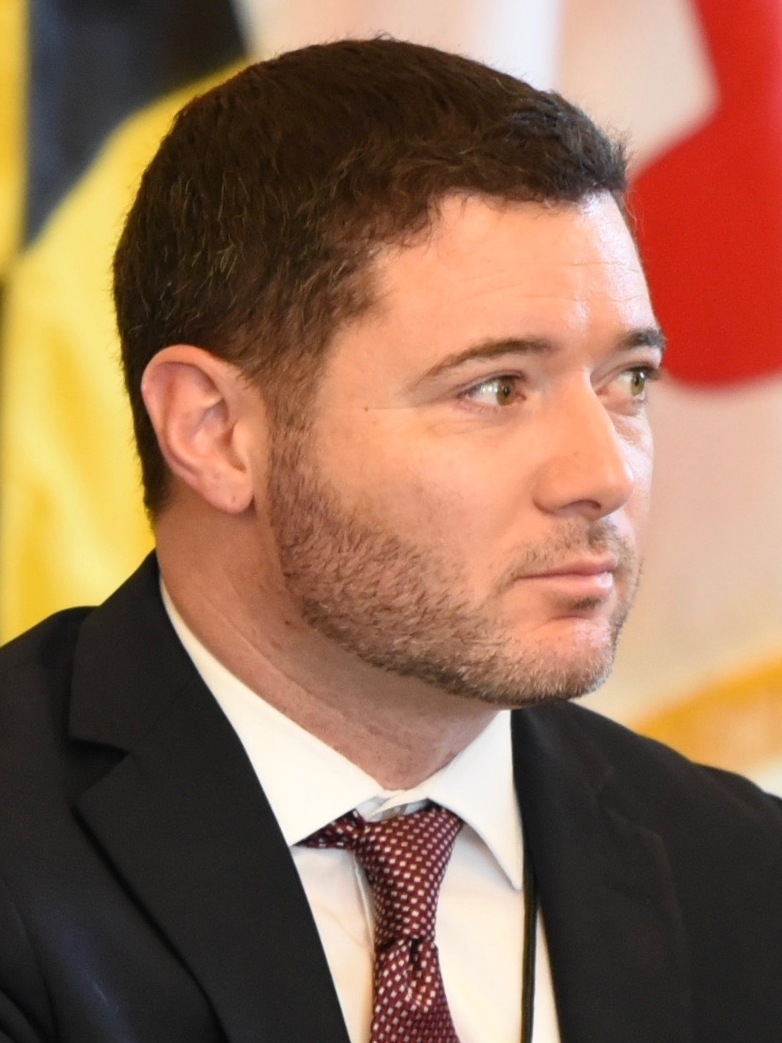
- Miele in 2019

Member of the Maryland Senate from the 34th district
- In office January 5, 2023 – January 11, 2023
- Appointed by: Larry Hogan
- Preceded by: Robert Cassilly
- Succeeded by: Mary-Dulany James

Deputy Secretary of the Maryland Department of Disabilities
- In office January 9, 2019 – January 4, 2023
- Appointed by: Larry Hogan
- Secretary: Carol Beatty
- Preceded by: William J. Frank
- Succeeded by: Lisa Belcastro

Member of the Maryland House of Delegates from the 8th district
- In office January 14, 2015 – January 9, 2019 Serving with Joe Cluster and Eric M. Bromwell
- Preceded by: Joseph C. Boteler III
- Succeeded by: Joseph C. Boteler III

Personal details
- Born: February 28, 1981 (age 45) Red Bank, New Jersey, U.S.
- Party: Republican
- Spouse: Jessica Minacapelli
- Children: 2
- Education: Towson University (BS, MA); Emory University (JD)
- Profession: Lawyer

Christian J. Miele (born February 28, 1981) is an American politician and lawyer who served as a member of the Maryland Senate from the 34th district from January 5 to January 11, 2023, and a member of the Maryland House of Delegates from the 8th district from 2015 to 2019. A member of the Republican Party, Miele served as the deputy secretary of the Maryland Department of Disabilities in the administration of Governor Larry Hogan from 2019 to 2023.

== Early life and education ==
Miele was born in Red Bank, New Jersey on February 28, 1981 to an Italian American father. Miele was raised in New Jersey and graduated from St. John Vianney High School, afterwards moving to Maryland to attend Towson University, where he was a member of the Sigma Pi fraternity and earned a Bachelor of Science degree in political science in 2004 and a Master of Arts degree in professional studies in 2008; and Emory University, where he was a member of the Phi Alpha Delta fraternity, served as the president of the Federalist Society for Law and Public Policy Studies, and earned a Juris Doctor degree in 2014.

== Career ==
After graduating from Towson, Miele worked as the university's coordinator for fraternity and sorority life from 2006 to 2010. While attending Emory, he co-founded and worked as the editor-in-chief for the Emory Corporate Governance and Accountability Review law journal, interned for the U.S. Department of Justice's criminal division, and clerked for Maryland Court of Appeals justice Glenn T. Harrell Jr. Miele was admitted to the Maryland Bar in 2017, after which he worked for injury law firm Pinder Plotkin LLC, first as an associate from 2017 to 2023 and then as a partner since 2023.

=== Maryland House of Delegates ===
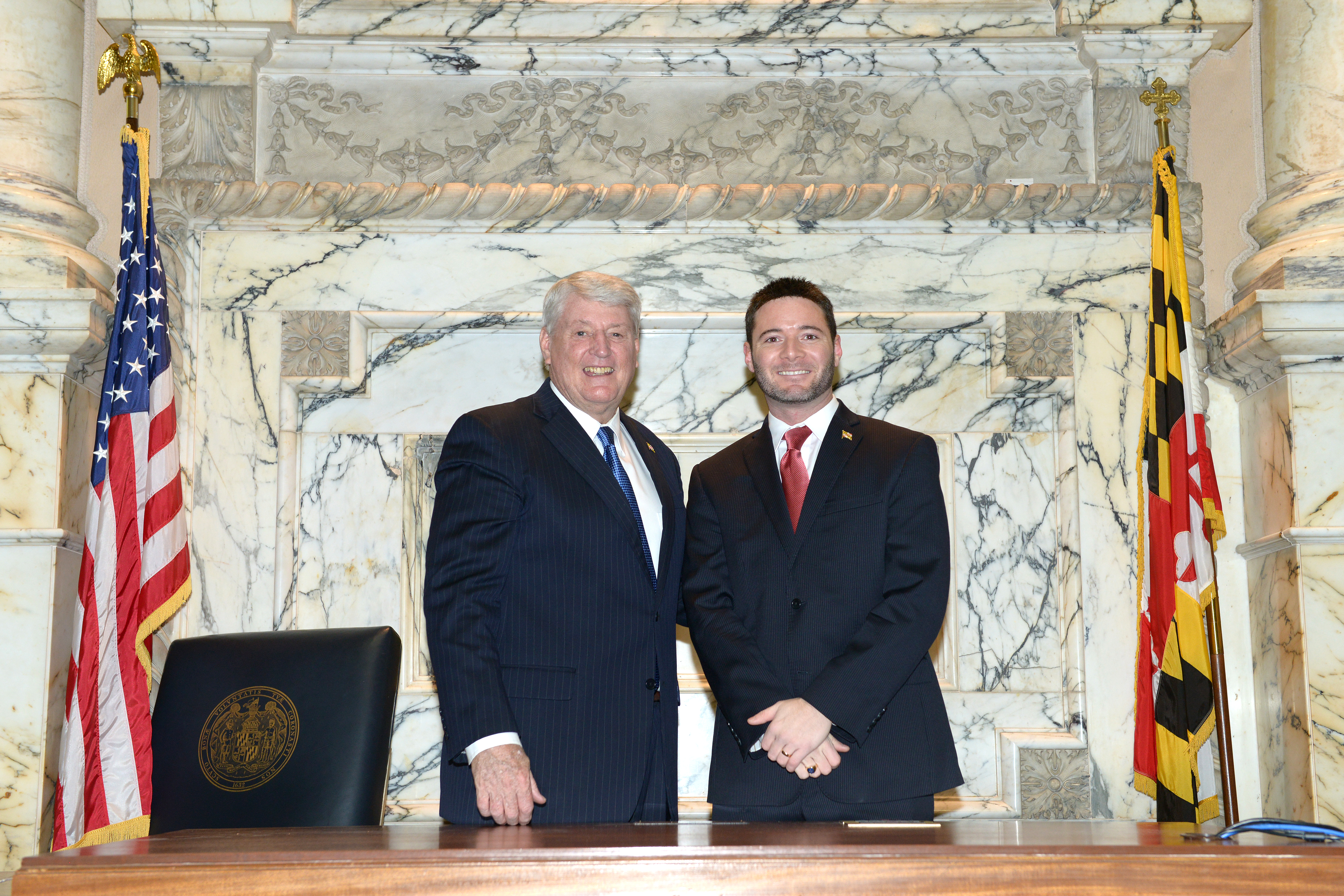
House Speaker Michael E. Busch (left) swears Miele (right) into the Maryland House of Delegates, 2015

In August 2013, Miele announced that he would run for the Maryland House of Delegates in District 8. He won election to the seat in the 2014 general election, and was sworn in on January 14, 2015. Miele served on the Health and Government Operations Committee during his entire tenure. Following his election, Miele was considered a rising star within the Maryland Republican Party.

In October 2014, the editorial board of The Baltimore Sun described Miele as a political moderate. During his 2014 House of Delegates campaign, he expressed support for legislation to legalize same-sex marriage in Maryland, decriminalize marijuana possession, and repeal the death penalty. In the legislature, he introduced the Hire Our Veterans Act, which incentivized businesses to hire military veterans; Janet's Law, which requires physicians practicing without insurance to disclose their lack of coverage to patients; and legislation to discourage bullying in public schools. Miele also introduced bills to strip lawmakers convicted of felonies of their pension benefits, and supported bills to decriminalize marijuana paraphernalia and to establish an independent redistricting commission to draw Maryland's political maps.

In November 2015, Miele was named as a co-chair for Marco Rubio's 2016 presidential campaign in Maryland.

=== Maryland Senate campaigns ===
==== 2018 8th district election ====
On June 8, 2017, Miele announced that he would run for the Maryland Senate in District 8 in 2018, challenging incumbent Democratic state senator Kathy Klausmeier. His candidacy was endorsed by Governor Larry Hogan and the Maryland Republican Party in their "Drive for Five" campaign. The election was seen as one of the most competitive in the Maryland Senate, as Miele was expected to benefit from having Hogan's endorsement, who won the district by 37 points in 2014, but Klausmeier was seen as being the slight favorite due to her high name recognition and strong community roots. Both candidates ran campaigns focused on local issues, including school overcrowding and the opioid epidemic.

Klausmeier defeated Miele in the general election on November 6, 2018, edging out Miele by a margin of 1,061 votes, or 2.3 percent. Following his defeat, in January 2019, Governor Larry Hogan appointed Miele to serve as the deputy secretary of the Maryland Department of Disabilities, replacing William J. Frank, who moved to a position within the Maryland Department of Budget and Management. In this capacity, Miele oversaw the department's legislative portfolio and managed its policy team.

==== 2022 34th district election ====
On July 2, 2021, Miele announced that he would run for the Maryland Senate in District 34, seeking to succeed Robert Cassilly, who retired to run for Harford County executive. He won the Republican primary election with 73.7 percent of the vote, defeating businessman Walter Tilley, and faced Democratic nominee and former state delegate Mary-Dulany James, who defeated Miele in the general election with 50.55 percent of the vote, or by a margin of 591 votes, on November 8, 2022.

External videos
- Swearing-In Ceremony of Christian Miele via YouTube

Following his defeat, in December 2022, Governor Larry Hogan appointed Miele to the Maryland Senate to replace Cassilly, who vacated the seat after winning the Harford County executive election. He was sworn in on January 5, 2023. Miele served in this position for six days until the start of the Maryland General Assembly's 445th legislative session on January 11, 2023.

=== Post-legislative career ===
Miele has worked as a public information officer for the Cecil County government since 2023. In 2024, he was elected to serve as the 49th Grand Sage (President) of the Sigma Pi Fraternity.

== Personal life ==
Miele is married to his wife, Jessica (née Minacapelli). Together, they have two children. Following his defeat in the 2018 Maryland Senate election, Miele and his family moved from Nottingham to Harford County.

== Electoral history ==
Maryland House of Delegates District 8 Republican primary election, 2014
Party	Candidate	Votes	%
Republican	John W. E. Cluster Jr. (incumbent)	3,586	35.6
Republican	Christian Miele	3,297	32.7
Republican	Norma Secoura	3,198	31.7

Maryland House of Delegates District 8 election, 2014
Party	Candidate	Votes	%
Republican	Christian Miele	20,164	19.4
Republican	John Cluster (incumbent)	19,938	19.2
Democratic	Eric Bromwell (incumbent)	17,361	16.7
Democratic	Bill Paulshock	15,899	15.3
Republican	Norma Secoura	15,660	15.1
Democratic	Renee Smith	14,704	14.2
Write-in		87	0.1

Maryland Senate District 8 Republican primary election, 2018
Party	Candidate	Votes	%
Republican	Christian Miele	20,164	19.4

Maryland Senate District 8 election, 2018
Party	Candidate	Votes	%
Democratic	Katherine A. Klausmeier (incumbent)	24,332	51.1
Republican	Christian Miele	23,271	48.8
Write-in		45	0.1

Maryland Senate District 34 Republican primary election, 2022
Party	Candidate	Votes	%
Republican	Christian Miele	7,317	73.7
Republican	Walter "Butch" Tilley	2,616	26.3

Maryland Senate District 34 election, 2022
Party	Candidate	Votes	%
Democratic	Mary-Dulany James	22,858	50.6
Republican	Christian Miele	22,267	49.2
Write-in		98	0.2
