= Maryland Department of Transportation =

State of Maryland's transport agency

Agency overview
- Formed: July 1, 1971; 55 years ago
- Jurisdiction: State of Maryland
- Headquarters: 7201 Corporate Center Drive Hanover, Maryland, U.S.
- Employees: 11,000 (FY 2021)
- Annual budget: $5.5 billion annual budget (FY 2021)
- Agency executives: Kathryn B. “Katie” Thomson, Secretary of Transportation; Vacant, Deputy Secretary
- Parent agency: State of Maryland
- Website: mdot.maryland.gov

The Maryland Department of Transportation (MDOT) is an organization comprising five business units and one Authority:

- Maryland Transportation Authority (Transportation Secretary serves as chairman of the Maryland Transportation Authority)
  - Maryland Transportation Authority Police
- Maryland Transit Administration
  - Maryland Transit Administration Police
- Maryland Port Administration
- State Highway Administration
- Maryland Motor Vehicle Administration
- Maryland Aviation Administration

== Secretaries of Transportation ==
- 2025–present, Kathryn B. "Katie" Thomson
- 2025, Samantha Biddle (Acting Secretary)
- 2023–2025, Paul Wiedefeld
- 2022–2023, James F. Ports Jr.
- 2020–2022, Gregory I. Slater
- 2015–2020, Pete K. Rahn
- 2013–2015, James T. Smith Jr.
- 2012–2013, Darrell Mobley (Acting Secretary)
- 2009–2012, Beverley K. Swaim-Staley
- 2007–2009, John D. Porcari
- 2003–2007, Robert L. Flanagan
- 1999–2003, John D. Porcari
- 1995–1998, David L. Winstead
- 1991–1994, O. James Lighthizer
- 1987–1991, Richard H. Trainor
- 1984–1987, William K. Hellmann
- 1981–1984, Lowell K. Bridwell
- 1979–1981, James J. O'Donnell
- 1977–1979, Herman K. Intemann
- 1971–1977, Harry R. Hughes
