= Paul Wiedefeld =

American politician (born 1955)

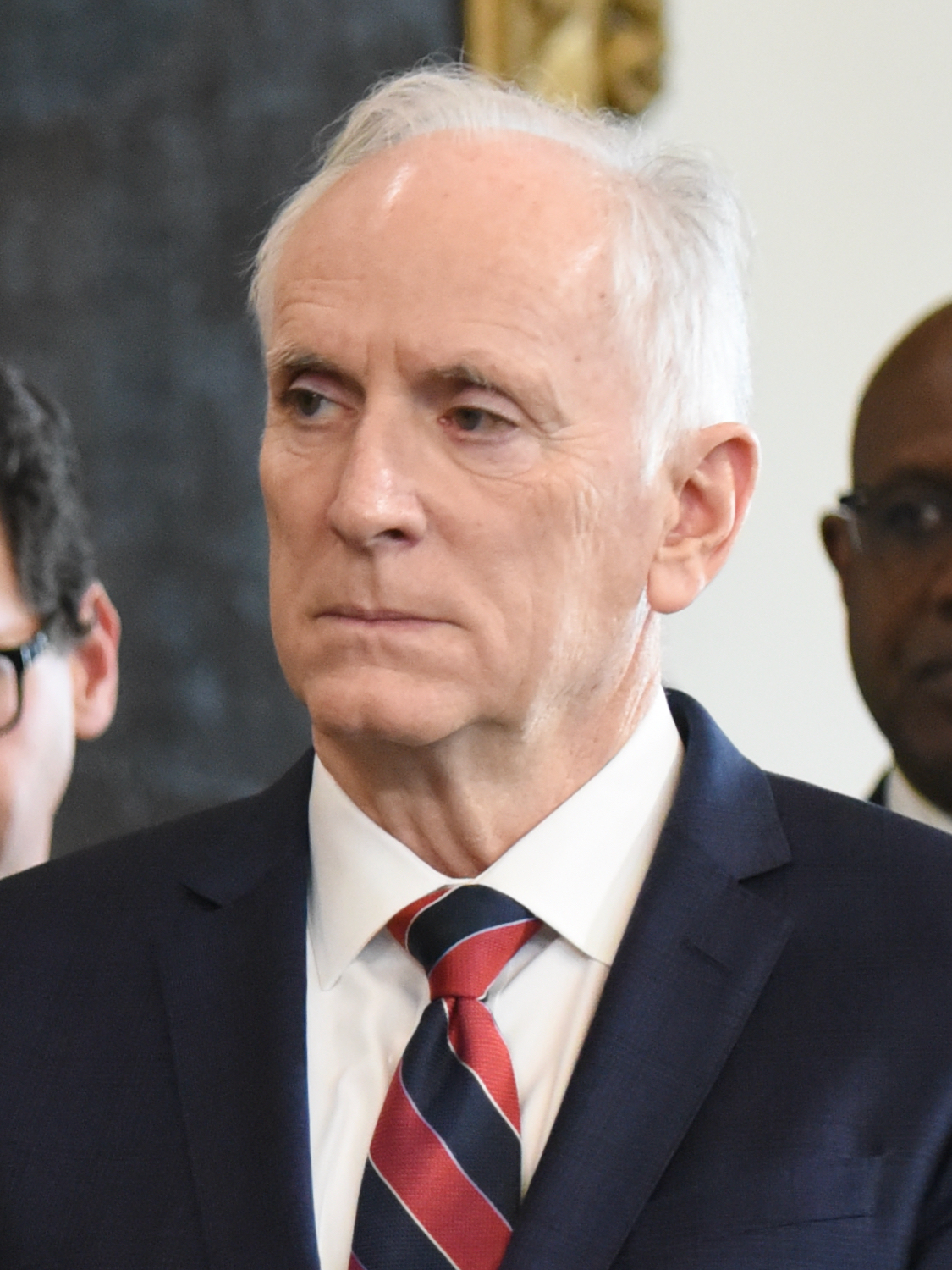
- Wiedefeld in January 2023

Maryland Secretary of Transportation
- In office March 2, 2023 – July 31, 2025
- Governor: Wes Moore
- Preceded by: James F. Ports Jr.
- Succeeded by: Samantha Biddle (acting)

General Manager of Washington Metropolitan Area Transit Authority
- In office November 30, 2015 – May 16, 2022
- Preceded by: Jack Requa (acting)
- Succeeded by: Andy Off (acting)

Executive Director of the Maryland Aviation Administration
- In office September 23, 2009 – July 10, 2015
- Governor: Martin O'Malley; Larry Hogan
- Preceded by: Timothy L. Campbell
- Succeeded by: Ricky D. Smith
- In office May 20, 2002 – July 20, 2005
- Governor: Parris Glendening; Bob Ehrlich
- Preceded by: David L. Blackshear
- Succeeded by: Timothy L. Campbell

Administrator of the Maryland Transit Administration
- In office January 17, 2007 – September 23, 2009
- Governor: Martin O'Malley
- Preceded by: Lisa Dickerson
- Succeeded by: Ralign T. Wells

Personal details
- Born: August 19, 1955 (age 71) Baltimore, Maryland, U.S.
- Children: 3
- Education: Towson University (BA); Rutgers University (MA)

Paul J. Wiedefeld (born August 19, 1955) is an American politician who served as the Maryland Secretary of Transportation under Governor Wes Moore from 2023 to 2025. He was previously the general manager of Washington Metropolitan Area Transit Authority from 2015 to 2022, the chief executive officer of the Maryland Aviation Administration from 2002 to 2005 and from 2009 to 2015, and the administrator of the Maryland Transit Administration from 2007 to 2009.

== Early life and education ==
Wiedefeld grew up in the Govans neighborhood of Baltimore, where he graduated from Mount Saint Joseph High School before attending Towson University, where he received a Bachelor of Science degree in political science. Wiedefeld later graduated from Rutgers University in 1981 with a Master of Arts degree in city and regional planning.

== Career ==
After graduating from Rutgers, Wiedefeld briefly worked as a planner in Morris County, New Jersey, before moving back to Baltimore. He began working for the Maryland Department of Transportation in 1986, where he played a leading role in managing dozens of transportation projects. From 1991 to 1994, he oversaw the department's Office of Systems Planning and Evaluation.

In 1994, Wiedefeld left the Maryland Department of Transportation to become the vice president of engineering and design firm Parsons Brinckerhoff. In April 2002, Governor Parris Glendening named Wiedefeld as the executive director of the Maryland Aviation Administration. While CEO, Wiedefeld oversaw the $1.8 billion expansion of Baltimore/Washington International Airport, which was one of the fastest-growing airports in the country at the time. In July 2005, Wiedefeld announced that he would be stepping down to work as the head of aviation consulting practice at Parsons Brinckerhoff.

In 2007, Governor Martin O'Malley named Wiedefeld as the administrator of the Maryland Transit Administration. In November 2008, he ordered the two-week shut down of the northern part of the Baltimore Light RailLink, citing a computerized braking system causing the trains' wheels to crack. In September 2009, Wiedefeld was named as the chief executive officer of the Maryland Aviation Administration, succeeding Timothy L. Campbell. In July 2015, Governor Larry Hogan announced that he would be replacing Wiedefeld with Ricky D. Smith, the head of Cleveland Hopkins International Airport.

=== WMATA General Manager ===
On November 5, 2015, the Washington Metropolitan Area Transit Authority announced that it would hire Wiedefeld as its next general manager following a year-long search. Wiedefeld took office on November 30, 2015. During his tenure, Wiedefeld sought to prioritize transit safety over rail service, believing it would restore public confidence in the transit system. He was also credited with overhauling the Metro's infrastructure while setting the stage for more-reliable and safer service in the future.

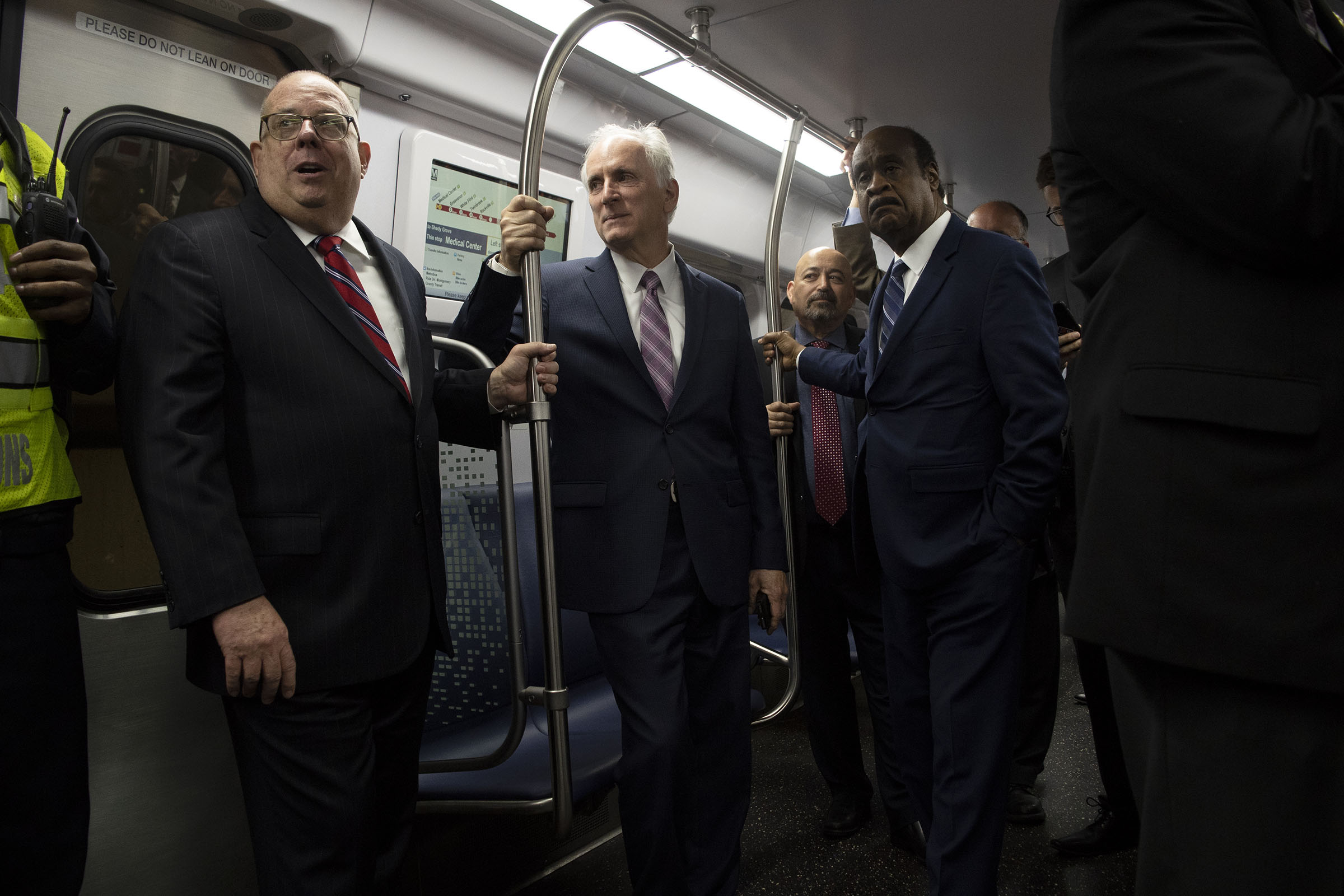
Wiedefeld rides the Red Line with Governor Larry Hogan and Montgomery County executive Ike Leggett, April 2018

In March 2016, following a smoke incident near the McPherson Square station, Wiedefeld halted WMATA's operations for 24 hours to allow inspectors to search for dangerously deteriorated power cables. This was the first time that Metrorail had ordered a subway closure on a fair-weather workday. This closure was announced with very little public notice, disrupting the commute of thousands of D.C. residents. During the closure, Metro work crews found at least 26 power cables and connectors that required immediate repair.

In May 2016, Wiedefeld unveiled his "SafeTrack" initiative, a nine-month maintenance blitz that saw the system endure a series of rolling shutdowns and slowdowns in an effort to condense three years worth of rail maintenance into roughly one year. The "safety surges" ranged in duration, from seven days to 42 days, and included either around-the-clock single tracking or line-segment shutdowns. These disruptions, combined with continued chronic breakdowns, contributed to a 12 percent decrease in Metro ridership and added to the agency's financial problems, creating a projected $125 million revenue shortfall during fiscal year 2018. The SafeTrack program concluded in June 2017.

In July 2016, Wiedefeld proposed a permanent end to late-night weekend subway services, saying that the proposed cuts were "vital to the future health of the system". The proposed service hours cut was criticized by Metro riders, local legislators, and members of the WMATA board. In December 2016, the Metro Board voted to approve a two-year service cut to late-night train services. Wiedefeld proposed bringing back some late-night services in his 2020 budget proposal, but the proposed hour extensions were pushed back until 2021.

In November 2016, Wiedefeld launched the "Back2Good" initiative, a $400,000 marketing campaign aimed at winning back consumer trust through rail-car maintenance and station improvements. A Washington Post interview with WMATA riders a year following the initiative's launch found customers had mixed reactions on the state of the system, despite the improvements made to its trains.

Also in November 2016, Wiedefeld announced that the Metro would be doubling the number of new cars in service by 2017 while replacing its older cars, the 1000- and 4000-series, with the new 7000-series cars. In December 2021, following the derailing of a 7000-series car on the Blue Line, the Washington Metrorail Safety Commission ordered WMATA's 7000-series cars out of service. Wiedefeld defended the transit agency's rail car problems in a United States House Committee on Oversight and Accountability hearing on February 9, 2022.

In April 2017, Wiedefeld proposed privatizing station operations and track maintenance on the western stretch of the Silver Line as a means of saving money by relying more on outside contractors. This proposal was opposed by Amalgamated Transit Union Local 689, the Metro's largest union, which argued that privatization would be bad for riders and would cost the transit agency more in the long-run. In September 2018, the Metro began requesting proposals from private companies to perform maintenance and operations on the Silver Line extension. In December 2019, Wiedefeld announced a four-year labor contract with ATU Local 689 that would allow the transit agency to give up its strategy of privatization. The four-year contract was approved by the Metro Board on December 20.

On January 18, 2022, Wiedefeld announced that he would retire as the general manager of WMATA, effective July 18. On May 16, 2022, after WMATA announced that half of its train operators had lacked retraining and testing required for recertification, Wiedefeld announced that he would resign as general manager effective immediately, two months ahead of his scheduled retirement. In October 2022, Wiedefield joined HDR, Inc. as the director of the firm's transportation practice in the northeast United States.

=== Maryland Secretary of Transportation ===
On January 24, 2023, Governor Wes Moore named Wiedefeld as the Maryland Secretary of Transportation. His nomination was unanimously approved by the Maryland Senate on February 17. As the Secretary of Transportation, Wiedefeld oversaw construction of the Purple Line, the revival of plans for the Red Line, and high-occupancy toll lane expansions to the Capital Beltway and Interstate 270. The Francis Scott Key Bridge collapse occurred during his tenure, and he was involved in press briefings in the immediate aftermath of the event.

In December 2023, facing a long-term budget shortfall, Wiedefeld announced a six-year plan to cut the state's transportation budget by $3.3 billion, or eight percent, including a $1.6 billion cut to "all major highway expansion construction projects" and a $652 million cut to transit expansion projects. The proposed plan would reduce commuter bus services and lines, delay the state's transition to electric buses, and cancel plans to expand the Brunswick Line. Although the legislature included provisions to raise fees on vehicle registration for electric vehicles and heavier cars to prevent drastic cuts to the state's transportation projects, Wiedefeld again proposed $1.3 billion in cuts to Maryland's transportation budget in September 2024, which would delay various infrastructure projects around the state, including the widening of the American Legion Memorial Bridge and the state's transition to electric buses.

Wiedefeld resigned as Maryland Secretary of Transportation on August 1, 2025. He was succeeded by deputy secretary Samantha Biddle, who served as interim secretary until December 18, 2025, when Governor Moore named Kathryn Thomson to be the next Maryland Secretary of Transportation.

== Personal life ==
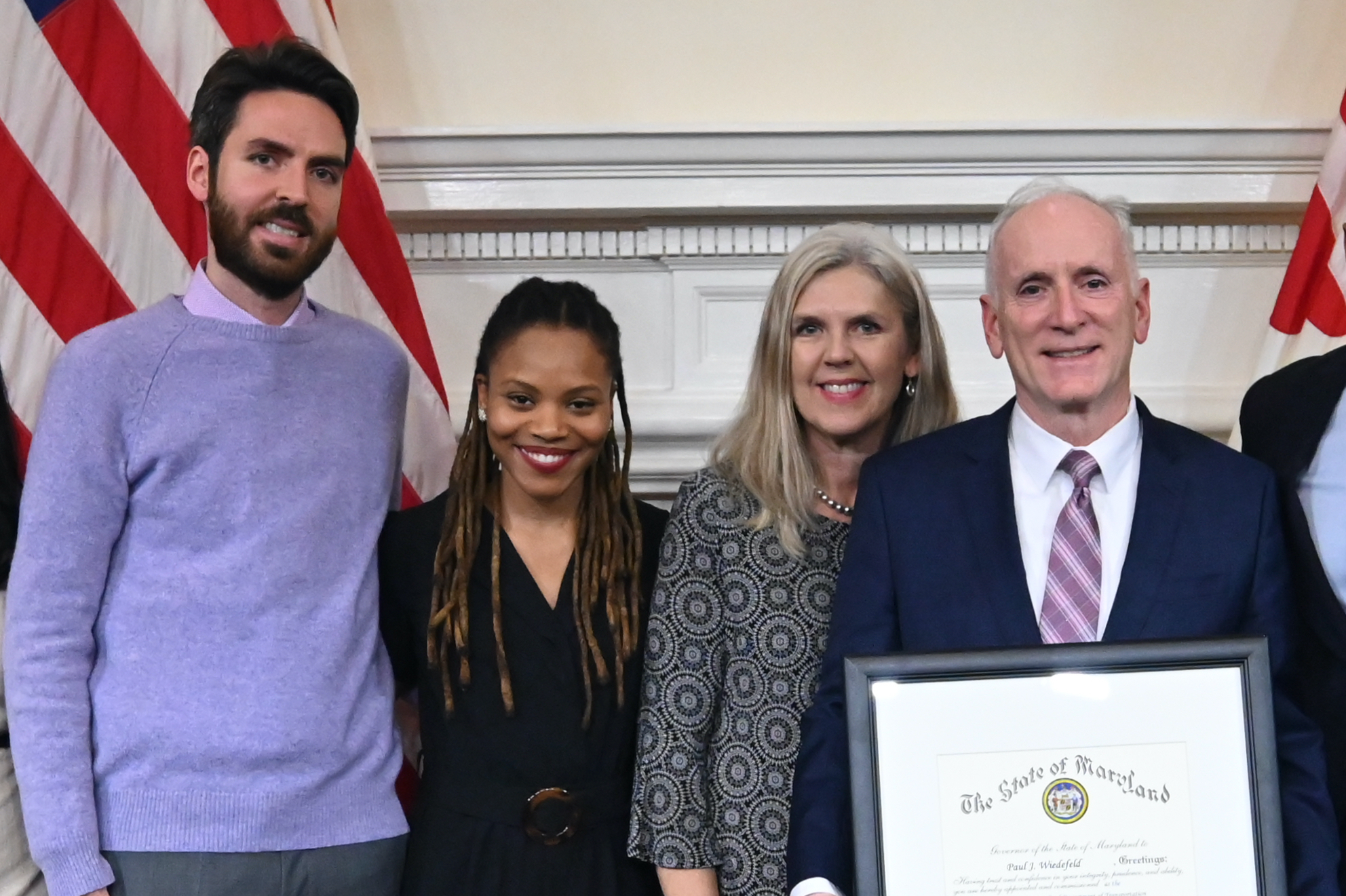
Wiedefeld and his wife with two of their children at his swearing in, 2023

Wiedefeld and his wife have three children and live in Towson, Maryland.

Political offices
Preceded by James F. Ports Jr.	Maryland Secretary of Transportation; 2023–2025	Succeeded by Samantha Biddle; Acting
Preceded by Timothy L. Campbell	Executive Director of the Maryland Aviation Administration; 2009–2015; 2002–2005	Succeeded by Ricky D. Smith
Preceded by David L. Blackshear	Executive Director of the Maryland Aviation Administration; 2009–2015; 2002–2005	Succeeded by Timothy L. Campbell
Preceded by Lisa Dickerson	Administrator of the Maryland Transit Administration; 2007–2009	Succeeded by Ralign T. Wells
Civic offices
Preceded by Richard Sarles	WMATA General Manager; 2015–2022	Succeeded by Randy Clarke
