= Maryland Department of Agriculture =

State agency of Maryland, US

Agency overview
- Formed: 1972; 54 years ago
- Headquarters: Annapolis, Maryland, U.S.
- Agency executive: Kevin Atticks, Secretary
- Website: mda.maryland.gov/Pages/default.aspx

The Maryland Department of Agriculture (MDA) is a state agency of Maryland. Its headquarters are in the Parole census-designated place in unincorporated Anne Arundel County, near Annapolis. The department was established in 1972.

As of 2023, the secretary of the department is Kevin Atticks, appointed by Governor Wes Moore. He was preceded in this position by Joseph Bartenfelder.

The department provides various initiatives to promote local agriculture, such as the "True Blue Maryland Crab Meat" ranking which allows local restaurants to certify restaurants that are serving local crabmeat rather than something imported from out of state.
