= Maryland Legislative District 8 =

American legislative district

Maryland's legislative district 8
- Represents part of Baltimore County
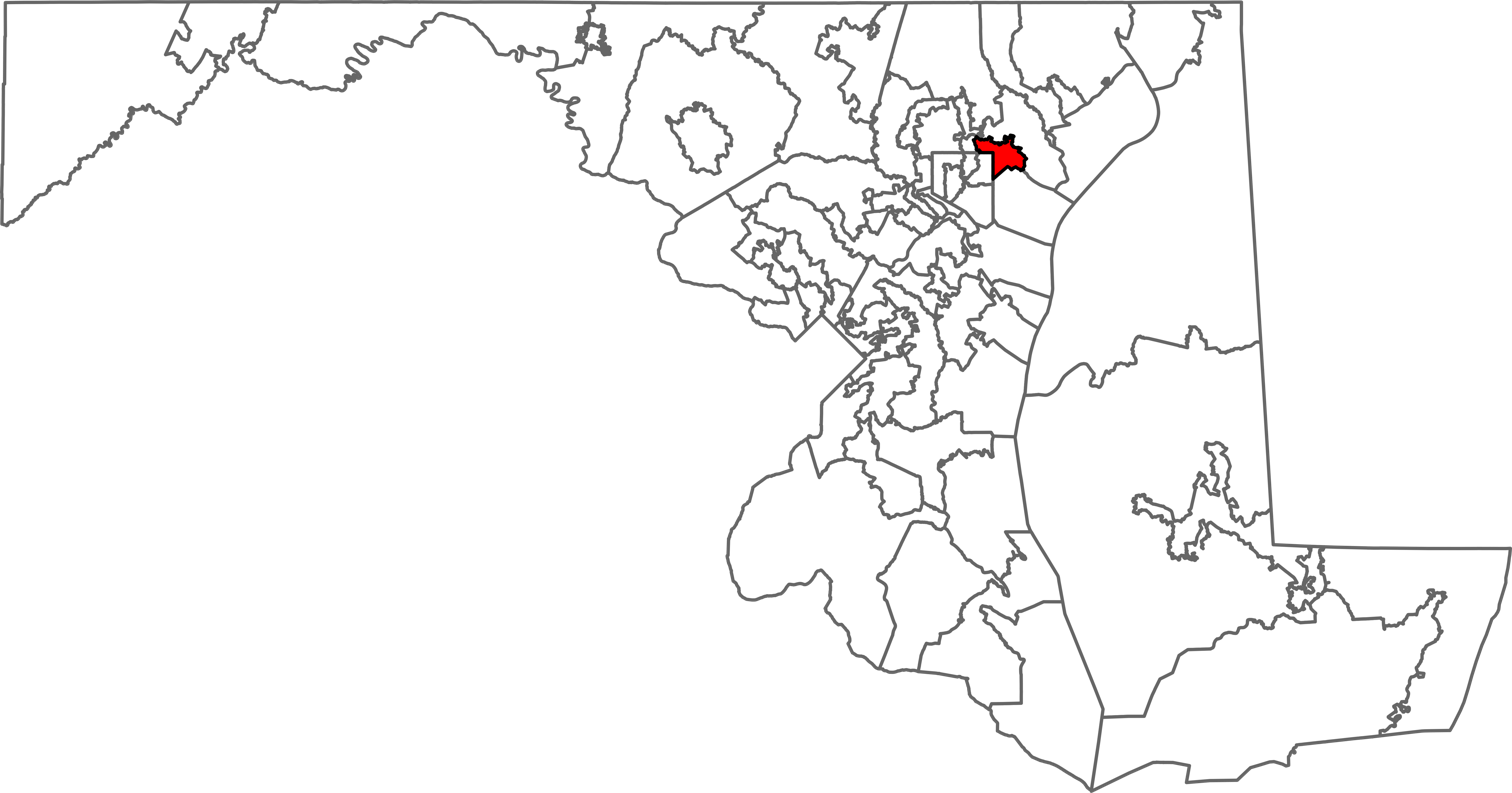
- Senator: Carl W. Jackson (D)
- Delegate(s): Nick Allen (D); Harry Bhandari (D); Kim Ross (D)
- Registration: 53.3% Democratic; 26.5% Republican; 18.6% unaffiliated
- Demographics: 51.8% White; 30.3% Black/African American; 0.3% Native American; 8.5% Asian; 0.0% Hawaiian/Pacific Islander; 3.1% Other race; 5.9% Two or more races; 6.0% Hispanic
- Population (2020): 128,063
- Voting-age population: 100,573
- Registered voters: 85,483

Maryland Legislative District 8 is one of 47 districts in the state for the Maryland General Assembly. The district consists of part of Baltimore County, Maryland. The district includes the communities of Carney, Overlea, Parkville, Perry Hall, Rosedale, Rossville, Towson, and White Marsh. The district is represented by three delegates in the Maryland House of Delegates.

== History ==
The district was established in 1975. The district also represented a small portion of Northeast Baltimore City, Maryland from 1995 to 2002.

== Demographic characteristics ==
As of the 2020 United States census, the district had a population of 128,063, of whom 100,573 (78.5%) were of voting age. The racial makeup of the district was 66,336 (51.8%) White, 38,866 (30.3%) African American, 419 (0.3%) Native American, 10,891 (8.5%) Asian, 25 (0.0%) Pacific Islander, 3,920 (3.1%) from some other race, and 7,584 (5.9%) from two or more races. Hispanic or Latino of any race were 7,625 (6.0%) of the population.

The district had 85,483 registered voters as of October 17, 2020, of whom 15,859 (18.6%) were registered as unaffiliated, 22,639 (26.5%) were registered as Republicans, 45,541 (53.3%) were registered as Democrats, and 889 (1.0%) were registered to other parties.

== Political representation ==
The district is represented for the 2023–2027 legislative term in the State Senate by Carl W. Jackson (D). It is represented by the House of Delegates by Nick Allen (D), Harry Bhandari (D), and Kim Ross (D).

== Election history ==
Thomas L. Bromwell resigned from the Senate in 2002 to head the Maryland Injured Workers' Insurance Fund or IWIF, a state agency. Governor Parris Glendening appointed John R. Schneider to replace Bromwell in District 8. Schneider died only two months after his appointment, and Governor Glendening then appointed Joseph T. Ferraracci to the seat. However, Ferraracci did not run for election in 2002. Neither Schneider or Ferraracci served in the legislature during session. Kathy Klausmeier ran for the seat as a Democrat and won.

John W. E. Cluster Jr. was appointed as Delegate by Governor Bob Ehrlich in 2003 to replace Republican Alfred W. Redmer Jr., who was named Maryland Insurance Commissioner.

Joe Cluster was appointed by Governor Larry Hogan in 2016 to fill the vacancy of former Delegate John Cluster, his father, who resigned to serve on the Maryland Parole Commission.

Carl W. Jackson was appointed by Governor Larry Hogan in 2019 to fill the vacancy of former Delegate Eric M. Bromwell, who resigned to serve as Baltimore County Opioid Strategy Coordinator.

Session	Senate	Delegates		
1975	Roy N. Staten (D)	John S. Arnick (D)	Daniel J. Minnick, Jr. (D)	Patrick T. Welsh (D)
1976	Roy N. Staten (D)	John S. Arnick (D)	Daniel J. Minnick, Jr. (D)	Patrick T. Welsh (D)
1977	Roy N. Staten (D)	John S. Arnick (D)	Daniel J. Minnick, Jr. (D)	Patrick T. Welsh (D)
1978	Roy N. Staten (D)	John S. Arnick (D)	Daniel J. Minnick, Jr. (D)	Patrick T. Welsh (D)
1979	Patrick T. Welsh (D)	Louis L. DePazzo (D)	Daniel J. Minnick, Jr. (D)	Robert R. Staab (D)
1980	Patrick T. Welsh (D)	Louis L. DePazzo (D)	Daniel J. Minnick, Jr. (D)	Robert R. Staab (D)
1981	Patrick T. Welsh (D)	Louis L. DePazzo (D)	Daniel J. Minnick, Jr. (D)	Robert R. Staab (D)
1982	Patrick T. Welsh (D)	Louis L. DePazzo (D)	Daniel J. Minnick, Jr. (D)	Robert R. Staab (D)
1983	Thomas L. Bromwell (D) (Note: Resigned in 2002.)	Dale Anderson (D)	Joseph Bartenfelder (D)	William J. Burgess (D)
1984	Thomas L. Bromwell (D)	Dale Anderson (D)	Joseph Bartenfelder (D)	William J. Burgess (D)
1985	Thomas L. Bromwell (D)	Dale Anderson (D)	Joseph Bartenfelder (D)	William J. Burgess (D)
1986	Thomas L. Bromwell (D)	Dale Anderson (D)	Joseph Bartenfelder (D)	William J. Burgess (D)
1987	Thomas L. Bromwell (D)	Donna M. Felling (D)	Joseph Bartenfelder (D)	William J. Burgess (D)
1988	Thomas L. Bromwell (D)	Donna M. Felling (D)	Joseph Bartenfelder (D)	William J. Burgess (D)
1989	Thomas L. Bromwell (D)	Donna M. Felling (D)	Joseph Bartenfelder (D)	William J. Burgess (D)
1990	Thomas L. Bromwell (D)	Donna M. Felling (D)	Joseph Bartenfelder (D)	William J. Burgess (D)
1991	Thomas L. Bromwell (D)	James F. Ports, Jr. (R)	Joseph Bartenfelder (D)	Alfred W. Redmer, Jr. (R) (Note: Left role in 2003 to serve as Maryland Insurance Commissioner.)
1992	Thomas L. Bromwell (D)	James F. Ports, Jr. (R)	Joseph Bartenfelder (D)	Alfred W. Redmer, Jr. (R)
1993	Thomas L. Bromwell (D)	James F. Ports, Jr. (R)	Joseph Bartenfelder (D)	Alfred W. Redmer, Jr. (R)
1994	Thomas L. Bromwell (D)	James F. Ports, Jr. (R)	Joseph Bartenfelder (D)	Alfred W. Redmer, Jr. (R)
1995	Thomas L. Bromwell (D)	James F. Ports, Jr. (R)	Kathy Klausmeier (D)	Alfred W. Redmer, Jr. (R)
1996	Thomas L. Bromwell (D)	James F. Ports, Jr. (R)	Kathy Klausmeier (D)	Alfred W. Redmer, Jr. (R)
1997	Thomas L. Bromwell (D)	James F. Ports, Jr. (R)	Kathy Klausmeier (D)	Alfred W. Redmer, Jr. (R)
1998	Thomas L. Bromwell (D)	James F. Ports, Jr. (R)	Kathy Klausmeier (D)	Alfred W. Redmer, Jr. (R)
1999	Thomas L. Bromwell (D)	James F. Ports, Jr. (R)	Kathy Klausmeier (D)	Alfred W. Redmer, Jr. (R)
2000	Thomas L. Bromwell (D)	James F. Ports, Jr. (R)	Kathy Klausmeier (D)	Alfred W. Redmer, Jr. (R)
2001	Thomas L. Bromwell (D)	James F. Ports, Jr. (R)	Kathy Klausmeier (D)	Alfred W. Redmer, Jr. (R)
2002	Thomas L. Bromwell (D)	James F. Ports, Jr. (R)	Kathy Klausmeier (D)	Alfred W. Redmer, Jr. (R)
2003	Kathy Klausmeier (D)	Joseph C. Boteler (R)	Eric M. Bromwell (D) (Note: Resigned in 2019 to become the Baltimore County Opioid Strategy Coordinator.)	John W. E. Cluster Jr. (R) (Note: Appointed by Governor Ehrlich to replace Redmer.)
2004	Kathy Klausmeier (D)	Joseph C. Boteler (R)	Eric M. Bromwell (D)	John W. E. Cluster Jr. (R)
2005	Kathy Klausmeier (D)	Joseph C. Boteler (R)	Eric M. Bromwell (D)	John W. E. Cluster Jr. (R)
2006	Kathy Klausmeier (D)	Joseph C. Boteler (R)	Eric M. Bromwell (D)	John W. E. Cluster Jr. (R)
2007	Kathy Klausmeier (D)	Joseph C. Boteler (R)	Eric M. Bromwell (D)	Todd Schuler (D)
2008	Kathy Klausmeier (D)	Joseph C. Boteler (R)	Eric M. Bromwell (D)	Todd Schuler (D)
2009	Kathy Klausmeier (D)	Joseph C. Boteler (R)	Eric M. Bromwell (D)	Todd Schuler (D)
2010	Kathy Klausmeier (D)	Joseph C. Boteler (R)	Eric M. Bromwell (D)	Todd Schuler (D)
2011	Kathy Klausmeier (D)	Joseph C. Boteler (R)	Eric M. Bromwell (D)	John W. E. Cluster Jr. (R) (Note: Resigned in 2016 to serve on the Maryland Parole Board.)
2012	Kathy Klausmeier (D)	Joseph C. Boteler (R)	Eric M. Bromwell (D)	John W. E. Cluster Jr. (R)
2013	Kathy Klausmeier (D)	Joseph C. Boteler (R)	Eric M. Bromwell (D)	John W. E. Cluster Jr. (R)
2014	Kathy Klausmeier (D)	Joseph C. Boteler (R)	Eric M. Bromwell (D)	John W. E. Cluster Jr. (R)
2015	Kathy Klausmeier (D)	Christian Miele (R)	Eric M. Bromwell (D)	John W. E. Cluster Jr. (R)
2016	Kathy Klausmeier (D)	Christian Miele (R)	Eric M. Bromwell (D)	John W. E. Cluster Jr. (R)
2017	Kathy Klausmeier (D)	Christian Miele (R)	Eric M. Bromwell (D)	Joe Cluster (R) (Note: Appointed by Governor Hogan to replace his father, John W. E. Cluster Jr.)
2018	Kathy Klausmeier (D)	Christian Miele (R)	Eric M. Bromwell (D)	Joe Cluster (R)
2019	Kathy Klausmeier (D)	Harry Bhandari (D)	Eric M. Bromwell (D)	Joseph C. Boteler (R)
2020	Kathy Klausmeier (D)	Harry Bhandari (D)	Carl W. Jackson (D) (Note: Appointed by Governor Hogan to replace Bromwell.)	Joseph C. Boteler (R)
2021	Kathy Klausmeier (D)	Harry Bhandari (D)	Carl W. Jackson (D)	Joseph C. Boteler (R)
2022	Kathy Klausmeier (D)	Harry Bhandari (D)	Carl W. Jackson (D)	Joseph C. Boteler (R)
2023	Kathy Klausmeier (D)	Harry Bhandari (D)	Carl W. Jackson (D)	Nick Allen (D)
2024	Kathy Klausmeier (D)	Harry Bhandari (D)	Carl W. Jackson (D)	Nick Allen (D)
2025	Carl W. Jackson (D) (Note: Appointed by Governor Moore to replace Klausmeier.)	Harry Bhandari (D)	Kim Ross (D) (Note: Appointed by Governor Moore to replace Jackson.)	Nick Allen (D)
2026	Carl W. Jackson (D)	Harry Bhandari (D)	Kim Ross (D)	Nick Allen (D)
2027	Carl W. Jackson (D)	Harry Bhandari (D)	Kim Ross (D)	Nick Allen (D)
2028	Carl W. Jackson (D)	Harry Bhandari (D)	Kim Ross (D)	Nick Allen (D)
2029	Carl W. Jackson (D)	Harry Bhandari (D)	Kim Ross (D)	Nick Allen (D)
2030	Carl W. Jackson (D)	Harry Bhandari (D)	Kim Ross (D)	Nick Allen (D)

== State Senate election results ==
- 2018 General Election for Maryland State Senate - District 8

Voters to choose one:

Name	Votes	Percent	Outcome
Kathy Klausmeier	24,332	51.1%	Won
Christian Miele	23,271	48.8%	Lost
Other Write-Ins	45	0.1%	Lost

- 2018 Democratic Primary Election for Maryland State Senate - District 8

Voters to choose one:

Name	Votes	Percent	Outcome
Kathy Klausmeier	8,495	87.7%	Won
Max Davidson	1,195	12.3%	Lost

- 2018 Republican Primary Election for Maryland State Senate - District 8

Voters to choose one:

Name	Votes	Percent	Outcome
Christian Miele	5,486	100.0%	Won

- 2014 General Election for Maryland State Senate - District 8

Voters to choose one:

Name	Votes	Percent	Outcome
Kathy Klausmeier, Dem.	23,638	61.2%	Won
Erik Lofstad, Rep.	14,938	38.7%	Lost
Other Write-Ins	37	0.1%	Lost

- 2014 Democratic Primary Election for Maryland State Senate - District 8

Voters to choose one:

Name	Votes	Percent	Outcome
Kathy Klausmeier	8,016	81.7%	Won
John Bishop	1,800	18.3%	Lost

- 2014 Republican Primary Election for Maryland State Senate - District 8

Voters to choose one:

Name	Votes	Percent	Outcome
Erik Lofstad	3,565	100.0%	Won

- 2010 General Election for Maryland State Senate - District 8

Voters to choose one:

Name	Votes	Percent	Outcome
Kathy Klausmeier, Dem.	25,155	59.7%	Won
Dee Hodges, Rep.	16,968	40.2%	Lost
Other Write-Ins	41	0.1%	Lost

- 2010 Democratic Primary Election for Maryland State Senate - District 8

Voters to choose one:

Name	Votes	Percent	Outcome
Kathy Klausmeier	9,273	100.0%	Won

- 2010 Republican Primary Election for Maryland State Senate - District 8

Voters to choose one:

Name	Votes	Percent	Outcome
Dee Hodges	4,155	71.8%	Won
Benjamin Lawless	1,633	28.2%	Lost

- 2006 General Election for State Senate - District 8

Voters to choose one:

Name	Votes	Percent	Outcome
Kathy Klausmeier, Dem.	24,299	58.2%	Won
Craig Borne, Rep.	17,401	41.7%	Lost
Other Write-Ins	37	0.1%	Lost

- 2006 Democratic Primary Election for Maryland State Senate - District 8

Voters to choose one:

Name	Votes	Percent	Outcome
Kathy Klausmeier	10,501	100.0%	Won

- 2006 Republican Primary Election for Maryland State Senate - District 8

Voters to choose one:

Name	Votes	Percent	Outcome
Craig Borne	3,083	68.1%	Won
Cal Clemons	1,444	31.9%	Lost

- 2002 General Election for Maryland State Senate - District 8

Voters to choose one:

Name	Votes	Percent	Outcome
Kathy Klausmeier, Dem.	24,590	58.5%	Won
John W. E. Cluster Jr., Rep.	17,426	41.4%	Lost
Other Write-Ins	55	0.1%	Lost

- 2002 Democratic Primary Election for Maryland House of Delegates - District 8

Voters to choose one:

Name	Votes	Percent	Outcome
Kathy Klausmeier	10,463	85.2%	Won
Raymond C. Shiflet	1,815	14.8%	Lost

- 2002 Republican Primary for Maryland State Senate - District 8

Voters to choose one:

Name	Votes	Percent	Outcome
John W. E. Cluster Jr.	5,209	100.0%	Won

- 1998 General Election for Maryland State Senate - District 8

Voters to choose one:

Name	Votes	Percent	Outcome
Thomas L. Bromwell, Dem.	22,837	68%	Won
William Rush, Rep.	10,954	32%	Lost

- 1998 Democratic Primary Election for Maryland State Senate - District 8

Voters to choose one:

Name	Votes	Percent	Outcome
Thomas L. Bromwell	7,585	100%	Won

- 1998 Republican Primary Election for Maryland State Senate - District 8

Voters to choose one:

Name	Votes	Percent	Outcome
William Rush	3,483	100%	Won

== House of Delegates election results ==
- 2018 General Election for Maryland House of Delegates - District 8

Voters to choose up to three:

Name	Votes	Percent	Outcome
Eric M. Bromwell	22,485	18.0%	Won
Harry Bhandari	22,094	17.7%	Won
Joseph C. Boteler	20,802	16.7%	Won
Carl W. Jackson	20,232	16.2%	Lost
Joe Cluster	20,084	16.1%	Lost
Joe Norman	18,898	15.2%	Lost
Other Write-Ins	99	0.1%	Lost

- 2018 Democratic Primary Election for Maryland House of Delegates - District 8

Voters to choose up to three:

Name	Votes	Percent	Outcome
Eric M. Bromwell	6,595	31.2%	Won
Harry Bhandari	5,941	28.1%	Won
Carl W. Jackson	5,246	24.8%	Won
Joe Werner	3,335	15.8	Lost

- 2018 Republican Primary Election for Maryland House of Delegates - District 8

Voters to choose up to three:

Name	Votes	Percent	Outcome
Joe Cluster	3,558	25.1%	Won
Joseph C. Boteler	3,008	21.2%	Won
Joe Norman	2,609	18.4%	Won
Norma Secoura	1,786	12.6%	Lost
Kevin Leary	1,589	11.2%	Lost
Ben Boehl	1,244	8.8%	Lost
Jared Wineberg	401	2.8	Lost

- 2014 General Election for Maryland House of Delegates - District 8

Voters to choose up to three:

Name	Votes	Percent	Outcome
Christian Miele, Rep	20,164	19.4%	Won
John W. E. Cluster Jr., Rep.	19,938	19.2%	Won
Eric M. Bromwell, Dem.	17,361	16.7%	Won
Bill Paulshock, Dem.	15,899	15.3%	Lost
Norma Secoura, Rep.	15,660	15.1%	Lost
Renee Smith, Dem.	14,704	14.2%	Lost
Other Write-Ins	87	0.1%	Lost

- 2014 Democratic Primary Election for Maryland House of Delegates - District 8

Voters to choose up to three:

Name	Votes	Percent	Outcome
Eric M. Bromwell	5,601	22.8%	Won
Renee Smith	4,632	18.9%	Won
Bill Paulshock	4,512	18.4%	Won
Harry "H.B." Bhandari	3,828	15.6%	Lost
Debbie Schillinger	3,124	12.7%	Lost
Steve Verch	1,752	7.1%	Lost
Kyle Arndreas Williams	1,114	4.5%	Lost

- 2014 Republican Primary Election for Maryland House of Delegates - District 8

Voters to choose up to three:

Name	Votes	Percent	Outcome
John W. E. Cluster Jr.	3,586	35.6%	Won
Christian Miele	3,297	32.7%	Won
Norma Secoura	3,198	31.7%	Won

- 2010 General Election for Maryland House of Delegates – District 8

Voters to choose up to three:

Name	Votes	Percent	Outcome
Joseph C. Boteler III, Rep.	21,688	19.4%	Won
John W. E. Cluster Jr. Rep.	19,462	17.41%	Won
Eric M. Bromwell, Dem.	19,379	17.33%	Won
Ruth Baisden, Dem.	18,640	16.67%	Lost
Norma Secoura, Rep.	16,458	14.72%	Lost
Cal Bowman, Dem.	16,101	14.4%	Lost
Other Write-Ins	80	0.1%	Lost

- 2010 Democratic Primary Election for Maryland House of Delegates - District 8

Voters to choose up to three:

Name	Votes	Percent	Outcome
Eric M. Bromwell	8,031	35.0%	Won
Ruth Baisden	7,772	33.9%	Won
Cal Bowman	7,124	31.1%	Won

- 2010 Republican Primary Election for Maryland House of Delegates - District 8

Voters to choose up to three:

Name	Votes	Percent	Outcome
Joseph C. Boteler	5,033	33.4%	Won
John W. E. Cluster Jr.	4,453	29.6%	Won
Norma M. Secoura	2,870	19.1%	Won
Rani Merryman	2,694	17.9%	Lost

- 2006 General Election for Maryland House of Delegates – District 8

Voters to choose up to three:

Name	Votes	Percent	Outcome
Eric M. Bromwell, Dem.	20,116	17.9%	Won
Joseph C. Boteler III, Rep.	19,586	17.4%	Won
Todd Schuler, Dem.	18,356	16.3%	Won
Ruth Baisden, Dem.	18,261	16.2%	Lost
Melissa Redmer Mullahey, Rep.	18,160	16.1%	Lost
John W. E. Cluster Jr. Rep.	18,057	16.0%	Lost
Other Write-Ins	74	0.1%	Lost

- 2006 Democratic Primary Election for Maryland House of Delegates - District 8

Voters to choose three:

Name	Votes	Precinct	Outcome
Eric M. Bromwell	7,019	24.9%	Won
Todd Schuler	6,428	22.8%	Won
Ruth Baisden	6,141	21.8%	Won
Alec Frick	3,514	12.5%	Lost
Peter Definbaugh	2,743	9.7%	Lost
Andrea Lynn Koshko	2,321	8.2%	Lost

- 2006 Republican Primary Election for Maryland House of Delegates - District 8

Voters to choose up to three:

Name	Votes	Percent	Outcome
Joseph C. Boteler	3,702	31.6%	Won
John W. E. Cluster Jr.	3,448	29.4%	Won
Melissa Redmer Mullahey	3,298	28.1%	Won
Anthony R. Davis	1,281	10.9%	Lost

- 2002 General Election for Maryland House of Delegates – District 8

Voters to choose up to three:

Name	Votes	Percent	Outcome
Alfred W. Redmer Jr., Rep.	22,884	19.61%	Won
Eric M. Bromwell, Dem.	20,314	17.41%	Won
Joseph C. Boteler III, Rep.	19,826	16.99%	Won
Mike Rupp, Rep.	18,755	16.07%	Lost
Tim Caslin, Dem.	18,553	15.90%	Lost
Todd Schuler, Dem.	16,277	13.95%	Lost
Other Write-Ins	86	0.07%	Lost

- 2002 Democratic Primary Election for Maryland House of Delegates - District 8

Voters to choose up to three:

Name	Votes	Percent	Outcome
Eric M. Bromwell	8,222	26.0%	Won
Tim Caslin	6,048	19.1%	Won
Todd Schuler	5,439	17.2%	Won
Ruth Baisden	5,057	16.0%	Lost
Andy Peet	2,904	9.2%	Lost
Joseph Michael Ruscito Jr.	2,816	8.9%	Lost
Walter Thomas Kuebler	1,166	3.7%	Lost

- 2002 Republican Primary Election for Maryland House of Delegates - District 8

Voters to choose up to three:

Name	Votes	Percent	Outcome
Alfred W. Redmer Jr.	4,521	29.0%	Won
Mike Rupp	3,506	22.5%	Won
Joseph C. Boteler	2,982	19.1%	Won
M. Norma Lane	2,347	15.0%	Lost
Mark Joseph Austra-Jaskulski	2,242	14.4%	Lost

- 1998 General Election for Maryland House of Delegates – District 8

Voters to choose up to three:

Name	Votes	Percent	Outcome
Kathy Klausmeier, Dem.	19,835	21%	Won
Alfred W. Redmer Jr., Rep	17,846	19%	Won
James F. Ports Jr., Rep.	17,756	19%	Won
J. Joseph Curran III, Dem.	17,583	19%	Lost
Joseph C. Boteler III, Rep.	11,306	12%	Lost
Taras Andrew Vizzi, Dem.	9,927	11%	Lost

- 1998 Democratic Primary Election for Maryland House of Delegates - District 8

Voters to choose three:

Name	Votes	Percent	Outcome
Kathy Klausmeier	6,815	35%	Won
J. Joseph Curran III	6,605	34%	Won
Taras Andrew Vizzi	2,411	12%	Won
David A. Lessner	2,110	11%	Lost
Walter Bernard Burrell Sr.	1,495	8%	Lost

- 1998 Republican Primary Election for Maryland House of Delegates - District 8

Voters to choose up to three:

Name	Votes	Percent	Outcome
Alfred W. Redmer, Jr.	3,553	32%	Won
James F. Ports, Jr.	3,344	30%	Won
Joseph C. Boteler	2,295	21%	Won
William Downs	1,070	10%	Lost
D. Robert Date	720	7%	Lost

- 1994 General Election for Maryland House of Delegates – District 8

Voters to choose up to three:

Name	Votes	Percent	Outcome
Kathy Klausmeier, Dem.	17,496	20%	Won
Alfred W. Redmer Jr., Rep.	14,876	18%	Won
James F. Ports Jr., Rep.	15,244	17%	Won
Calvin Clemons, Rep.	13,996	16%	Lost
Daniel E. McKew, Dem.	12,931	15%	Lost
John G. Disney, Dem.	11,886	14%	Lost

- 1994 Democratic Primary Election for Maryland House of Delegates - District 8

Voters to choose up to three:

Name	Votes	Percent	Outcome
Kathy Klausmeier	8,213	32%	Won
Daniel E. McKew	6,419	25%	Won
John G. Disney	4,747	19%	Won
David A. Lessner	3,190	13%	Lost
Charles Patrick Kazlo	2,854	11%	Lost

- 1994 Republican Primary for Maryland House of Delegates - District 8

Voters to choose up to three:

Name	Votes	Percent	Outcome
Alfred W. Redmer, Jr.	3,407	28%	Won
James F. Ports, Jr.	3,372	28%	Won
Calvin Clemons	2,675	22%	Won
Joseph C. Boteler	1,556	13%	Lost
D. Sharon Morris	1,103	9%	Lost

- 1990 General Election for Maryland House of Delegates – District 8

Voters to choose up to three:

Name	Votes	Percent	Outcome
Alfred W. Redmer Jr., Rep.	15,354	18%	Won
Joseph Bartenfelder, Dem.	14,876	18%	Won
James F. Ports Jr., Rep.	14,266	17%	Won
Kenneth G. Hirsch, Rep.	14,129	17%	Lost
Donna M. Felling, Dem.	13,006	15%	Lost
William J. Burgess, Dem.	12,680	15%	Lost
John Michael Fleig	20	0%	Lost

- 1990 Democratic Primary Election for the Maryland House of Delegates - District 8

Voters to choose up to three:

Name	Votes	Percent	Outcome
Joseph Bartenfelder	7,005	28%	Won
William Burgess	6,317	25%	Won
Donna M. Felling	6,147	25%	Won
Daniel E. McKew	5,318	21%	Lost

- 1990 Republican Primary Election for Maryland House of Delegates - District 8

Voters to choose up to three:

Name	Votes	Percent	Outcome
Alfred W. Redmer Jr.	1,857	30%	Won
Kenneth G. Hirsch	1,778	28%	Won
James F. Ports, Jr.	1,662	27%	Won
John Michael Fleig	942	15%	Lost

- 1986 General Election for Maryland House of Delegates – District 8

Voters to choose three:

Name	Votes	Percent	Outcome
Joseph Bartenfelder, Dem.	18,245	23%	Won
Donna M. Felling, Dem.	16,443	21%	Won
William J. Burgess, Dem.	16,049	20%	Won
Scott A. Sewell, Rep.	11,610	15%	Lost
Alfred W. Redmer Jr., Rep.	10,841	14%	Lost
Howard C. Harclerode, Rep.	5,782	7%	Lost

- 1986 Democratic Primary Election for Maryland House of Delegates - District 8

Voters to choose up to three:

Name	Votes	Percent	Outcome
Joseph Bartenfelder	10,695	29%	Won
William J. Burgess	9,134	24%	Won
Donna M. Felling	8,096	22%	Won
Dale Anderson	7,593	20%	Lost
Kenneth Skidmore	1,898	5%	Lost

1986 Republican Primary Election for Maryland House of Delegates - District 8

Voters to choose up to three:

Name	Votes	Percent	Outcome
Scott A. Sewell	1,925	33%	Won
Alfred W. Redmer, Jr.	1,661	29%	Won
Howard C. Haclerode	948	16%	Won
William A. Howard IV	708	12%	Lost
J. Franklin Ports	508	9%	Lost
