= John W. E. Cluster Jr. =

American politician

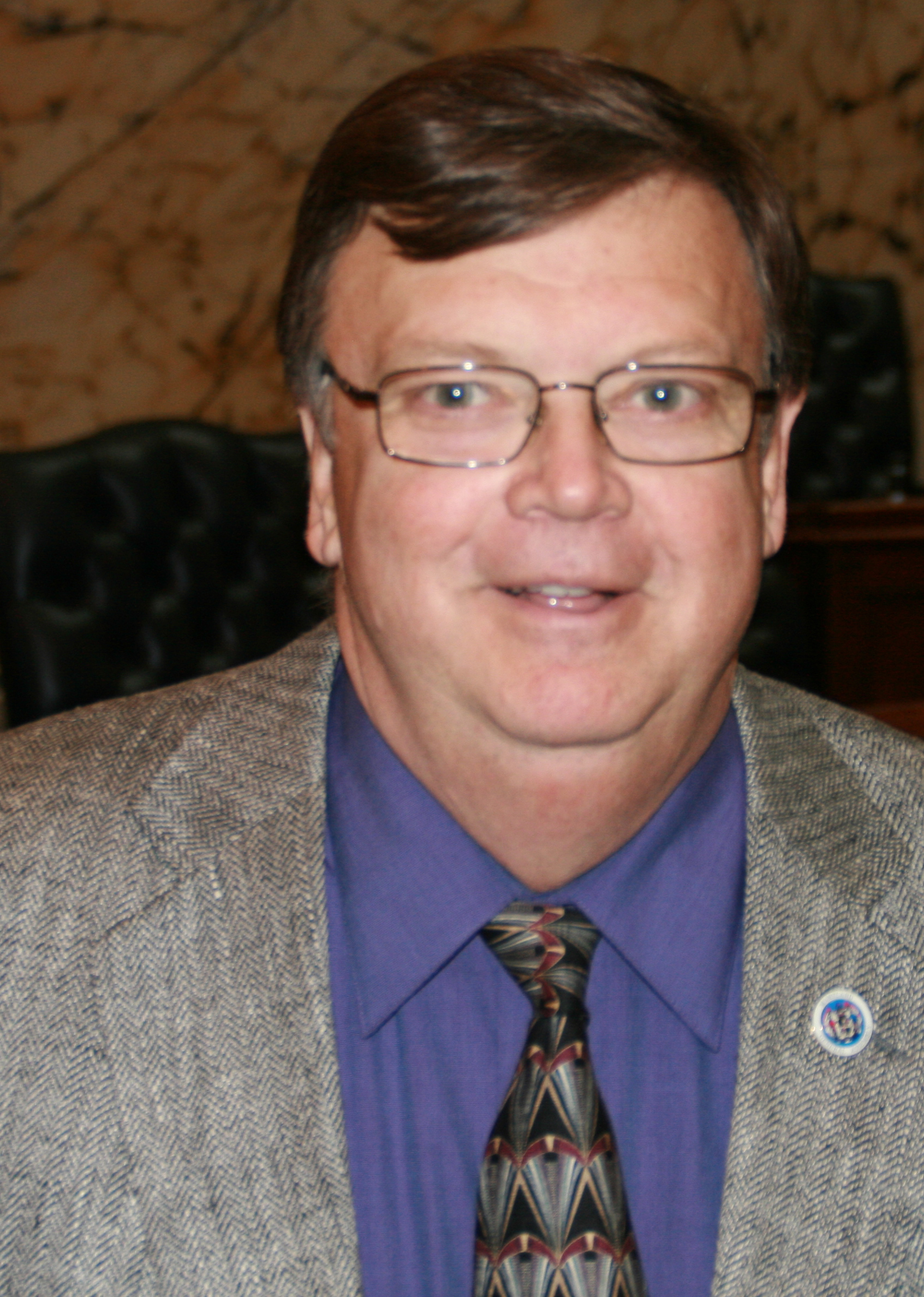
- Cluster in 2012

Member of the Maryland House of Delegates from the 8th district
- In office January 12, 2011 – July 31, 2016
- Preceded by: Todd Schuler
- Succeeded by: Joe Cluster

Member of the Maryland House of Delegates from the 8th district
- In office July 29, 2003 – January 10, 2007
- Preceded by: Alfred Redmer Jr.
- Succeeded by: Todd Schuler

Personal details
- Born: April 9, 1954 (age 72) Baltimore, Maryland, U.S.
- Party: Republican
- Children: 2 including Joe Cluster

John W. E. Cluster Jr. (born April 9, 1954) is a former member of the Maryland House of Delegates, representing the 8th district in Baltimore County.

== Background ==
Cluster was appointed as delegate to Baltimore County's District 8 by Governor Bob Ehrlich to replace Republican Alfred W. Redmer Jr., who was named Maryland Insurance Commissioner.

Cluster was appointed on July 11, 2003, and sworn in on July 29, 2003. He was defeated in his bid for election in 2006 by Democrat Todd Schuler. On November 2, 2010, Cluster regained his seat in the Maryland General Assembly, serving until he resigned July 31, 2016.

== Education ==
Cluster graduated from Catonsville High School in southwest Baltimore in 1972. After high school he attended Essex Community College.

== Career ==
Cluster was a patrolman for the Baltimore County Police Department from 1975 until 1979 when he was promoted to Corporal. He maintained this rank until 1983 when he was promoted to Sergeant, a position he held until 1989 when he retired. He later worked for the Department of Juvenile Services as the Director of Capital Planning and Facilities Management.

During his time in the Maryland House of Delegates, he was a Member of the Environmental Matters Committee and several subcommittees including the ethics subcommittee in 2004, the local government & bi-county agencies subcommittee, the motor vehicles & transportation subcommittee, the natural resources & ethics subcommittee from 2005 until 2006, and the natural resources subcommittee from 2006 until 2007. His caucus membership included the Maryland Legislative Sportsmen's Caucus and the Maryland Veterans Caucus.

Cluster is still active in his community. He has been a member of the Fraternal Order of Police Lodge #4 since 1975. He is a former member of the Board of Directors for the Baltimore County Retired Police Association. Additionally, he has been President of the Parkville Business and Professional Association since 2000 and he was a member of the Loch Raven Recreation Council and the Parkville Recreation Council.

== Election results ==
- 2014 Race for Maryland House of Delegates – District 08

Voters to choose three:

Name	Votes	Percent	Outcome
Christian Miele, Rep.	20,164	19.4%	Won
John Cluster, Rep.	19,938	19.2%	Won
Eric M. Bromwell, Dem.	17,361	16.7%	Won
Bill Paulshock, Dem.	15,899	15.3%	Lost
Norma Secoura, Rep.	15,660	15.1%	Lost
Renee Smith, Dem.	14,704	14.2%	Lost
Other Write-Ins	87	0.1%	Lost

- 2010 Race for Maryland House of Delegates – District 08

Voters to choose three:

Name	Votes	Percent	Outcome
Joseph C. Boteler III, Rep.	21,688	19.4%	Won
John Cluster, Rep.	19,462	17.41%	Won
Eric M. Bromwell, Dem.	19,379	17.33%	Won
Ruth Baisden, Dem.	18,640	16.67%	Lost
Norma Secoura, Rep.	16,458	14.72%	Lost
Cal Bowman, Dem.	16,101	14.4%	Lost
Other Write-Ins	80	0.1%	Lost

- 2006 Race for Maryland House of Delegates – District 08

Voters to choose three:

Name	Votes	Percent	Outcome
Eric M. Bromwell, Dem.	20,116	17.9%	Won
Joseph C. Boteler III, Rep.	19,586	17.4%	Won
Todd Schuler, Dem.	18,356	16.3%	Won
Ruth Baisden, Dem.	18,261	16.2%	Lost
Melissa Redmer Mullahey, Rep.	18,160	16.1%	Lost
John Cluster, Rep.	18,057	16.0%	Lost
Other Write-Ins	74	0.1%	Lost
