= Todd Schuler =

American politician

Todd L. Schuler
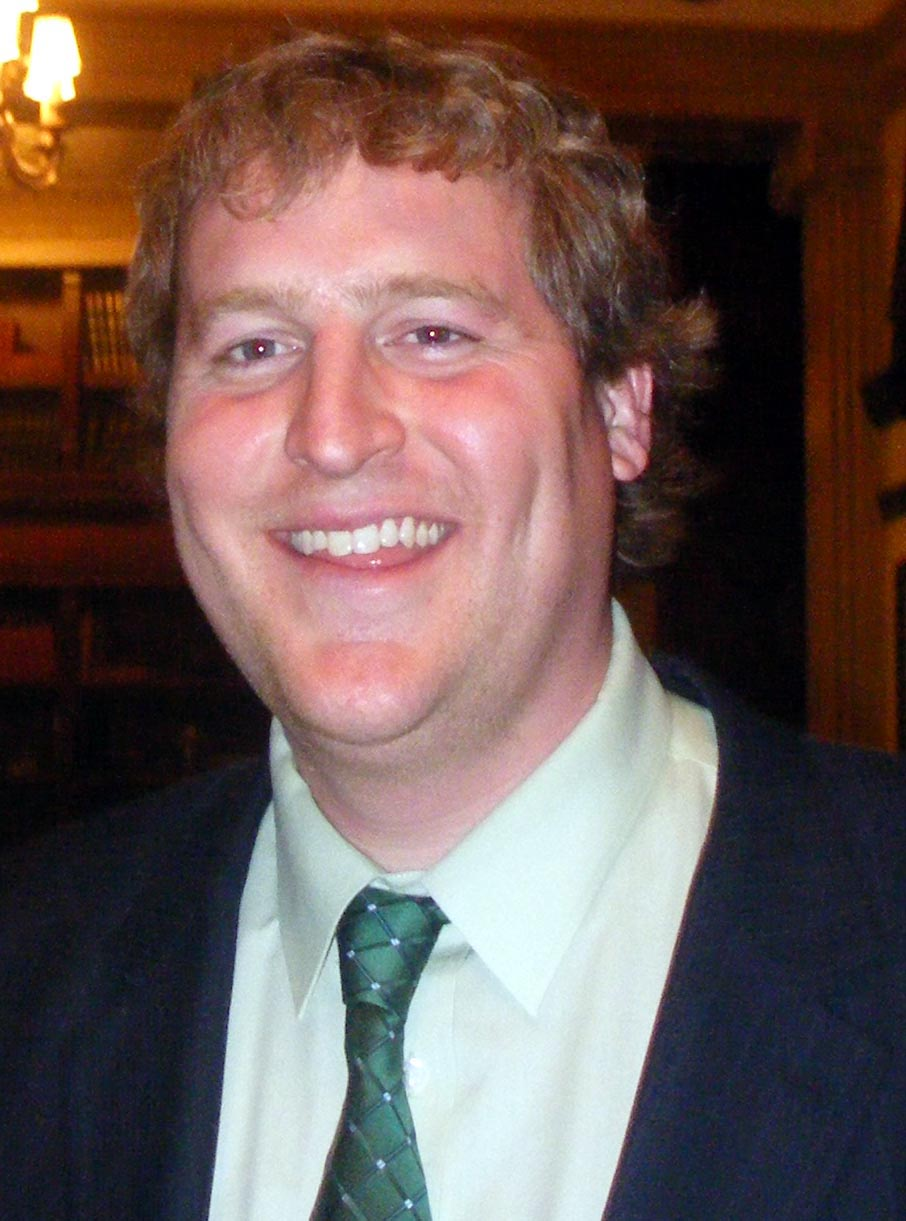
- Schuler in 2007

Member of the Maryland House of Delegates from the 8th district
- In office 2007–2011
- Preceded by: John W. E. Cluster Jr.
- Succeeded by: John W. E. Cluster Jr.
- Constituency: Baltimore County

Personal details
- Born: January 20, 1977 (age 49) Baltimore, Maryland, U.S.
- Party: Democratic
- Occupation: Attorney

Todd L. Schuler (born January 20, 1977) is an American politician from Maryland and a member of the Democratic Party.

== Background ==
Schuler was born in Baltimore, Maryland. His father, Leonard G. Schuler, is a business agent for Plumbers and Steamfitters U.A., Local 486. His mother, K. Michelle Schuler, is an office manager at the Career Development and Placement Center at Loyola College in Maryland. He attended Calvert Hall College High School, Spring Hill College and the Tulane University School of Law.

He was active with both the Maryland Bar Association, the Maryland Association for Justice, and with local Democratic Party organizations before his election. He is active in the Elmwood Improvement Association. Todd is a practicing attorney. He lives in Overlea with his wife, Colleen.

== In the legislature ==
Delegate Schuler served one term in the Maryland House of Delegates, representing Maryland's District 8 in Baltimore County. Schuler was a member of the Judiciary Committee and a member of its Civil Law and Procedure Subcommittee since his appointment and a member of its Criminal Justice Subcommittee since February, 2009.

In January 2009, Delegate Schuler became the first member of the Maryland General Assembly to report live the General Assembly Session via Twitter.

=== Legislative notes ===
- Co-sponsored legislation which would have brought bottle and can deposits to Maryland.
- Co-sponsored and helped pass legislation that increased the penalties for possession of child pornography.
- Voted against the Clean Indoor Air Act of 2007 (Ban on smoking in bars and restaurants) (HB359)
- Co-sponsored Religious Freedom and Civil Marriage Protection Act.
- Successfully sponsored a legislative bond bill that (along with its Senate counterpart bill) garnered $250,000 to help fund the Storyville Children's Learning Center at the Rosedale Library, a project of the Foundation for Baltimore County Public Library (HB360)
- Introduced legislation to ban plastic grocery bags.
- Co-sponsored Greenhouse Gas Emissions Reduction Act of 2009.
- Co-sponsored legislation to require the state to issue permits to carry handguns to all law-abiding citizens of sound mind.
- One of just eighteen Democrats to cross party lines and vote against the Special Session tax increases of 2007.

== Election results ==
- 2006 Race for Maryland House of Delegates – District 08

Voters to choose three:

Name	Votes	Percent	Outcome
Eric M. Bromwell	20,116	17.9%	Won
Joseph C. Boteler III, Rep.	19,586	17.4%	Won
Todd Schuler	18,356	16.3%	Won
Ruth Baisden	18,261	16.2%	Lost
Melissa Redmer Mullahey	18,160	16.1%	Lost
John W. E. Cluster Jr.	18,057	16.0%	Lost
Other Write-Ins	74	0.1%	Lost

- 2002 Race for Maryland House of Delegates – District 08

Voters to choose three:

Name	Votes	Percent	Outcome
Alfred W. Redmer, Jr.	22,884	19.61%	Won
Eric M. Bromwell	20,314	17.41%	Won
Joseph C. Boteler III, Rep.	19,826	16.99%	Won
Mike Rupp	18,755	16.07%	Lost
Tim Caslin	18,553	15.90%	Lost
Todd Schuler	16,277	13.95%	Lost
Other Write-Ins	86	0.07%	Lost
