= Kim Ross =

American politician

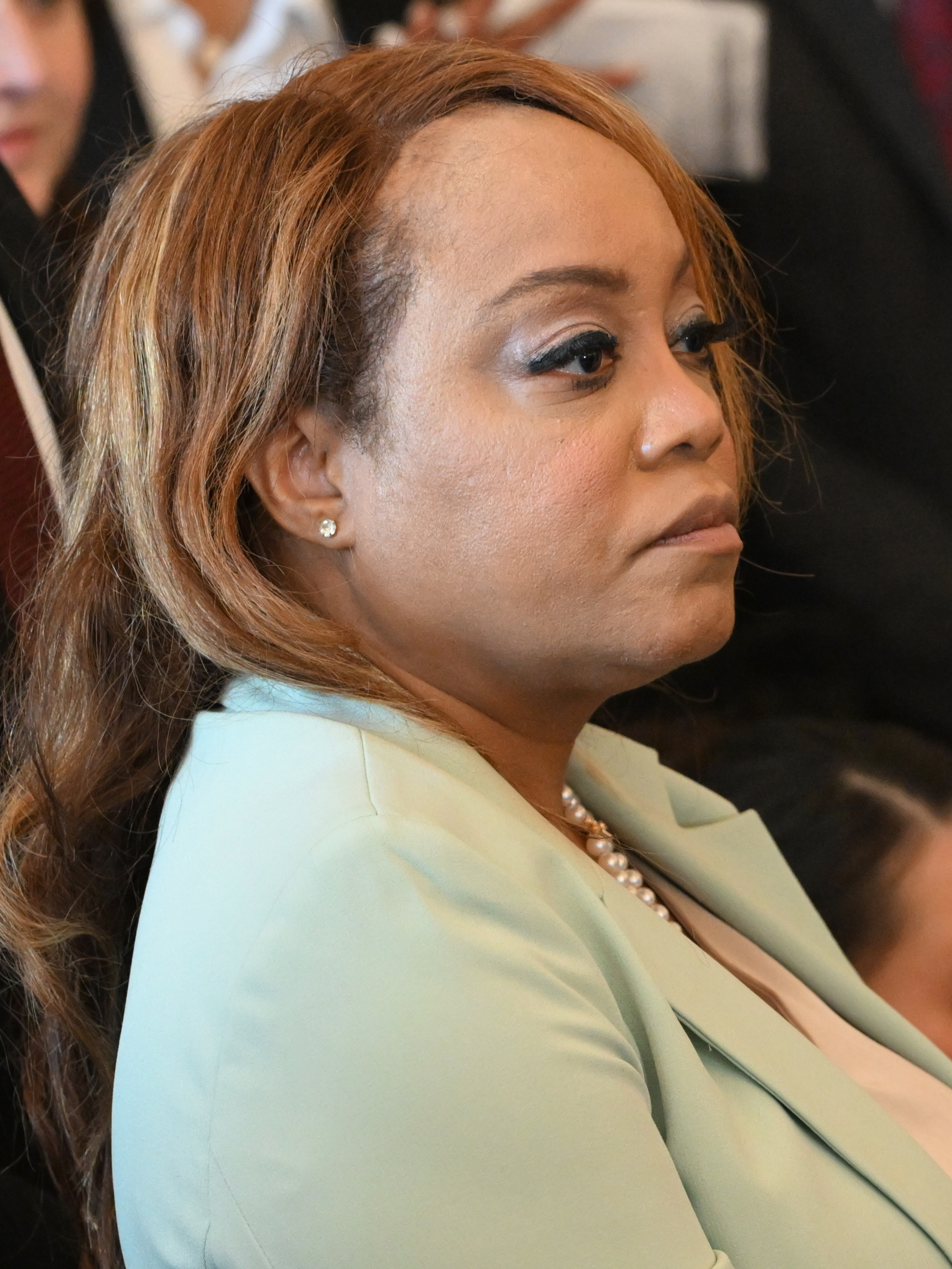
- Ross in 2026

Member of the Maryland House of Delegates from the 8th district
- Incumbent
- Assumed office March 3, 2025 Serving with Harry Bhandari and Nick Allen
- Appointed by: Wes Moore
- Preceded by: Carl W. Jackson

Personal details
- Party: Democratic
- Education: North Carolina Central University; New York University; University of Maryland Global Campus

Kim L. Ross is an American politician serving as a member of the Maryland House of Delegates from the 8th district since 2025.

== Background ==
Ross graduated from North Carolina Central University, where she earned a Bachelor of Arts degree in English, New York University, where she received a certificate in strategic media communications, and the University of Maryland Global Campus, where she earned a master's degree in strategic communications.

Ross worked as a financial news manager for Media Mill Works from 2003 to 2006. She also worked as a public relations account executive for Stanton Communications from 2005 to 2007, afterwards working as an editor and communications manager for the National Association for Public Health Statistics and Information Systems until 2010. Ross then worked as a senior communications manager for the Association of Public Health Laboratories until 2014, and has since worked as an editorial leader for Content Services.

Ross was appointed to the Community College of Baltimore County Board of Trustees by Governor Wes Moore. She was also the communications director for the Baltimore County Democratic Central Committee before it voted to elect her as a member of the Maryland House of Delegates.

== In the legislature ==
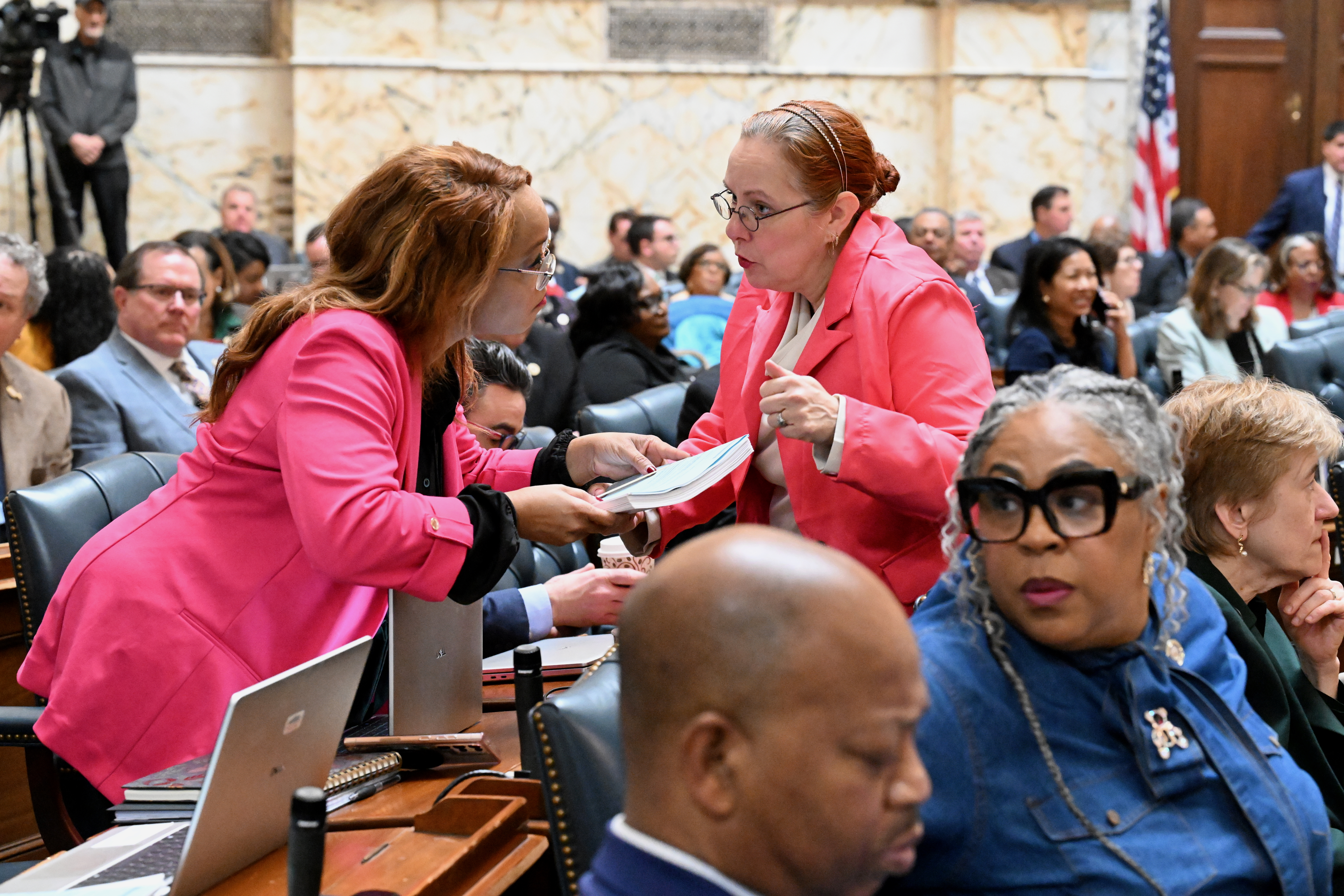
Ross (left) and Heather Bagnall on the House floor, 2026

Ross was appointed to the Maryland House of Delegates by Governor Wes Moore and sworn in on March 3, 2025. She is a member of the Health and Government Operations Committee.

== Personal life ==
As of January 2025, Ross is the president of the Franklin Point and Deerborne Homeowners Association.
