= Eric M. Bromwell =

American politician

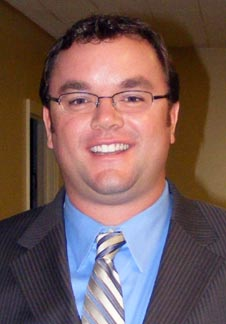
- Bromwell in 2007

Member of the Maryland House of Delegates from the 8th district
- In office January 8, 2003 – September 6, 2019 Serving with Alfred W. Redmer Jr., Joseph C. Boteler III, Harry Bhandari, Todd Schuler, John Cluster, and Christian Miele
- Preceded by: Kathy Klausmeier
- Succeeded by: Carl W. Jackson

Personal details
- Born: December 12, 1976 (age 49) Baltimore, Maryland, U.S.
- Party: Democratic
- Education: Calvert Hall College High School
- Alma mater: Salisbury University (BA)

Eric M. Bromwell (born December 12, 1976) is an American politician from Maryland and a member of the Democratic Party. Bromwell represented district 8 in the Maryland House of Delegates from January 2003 to September 2019. In September 2019 he resigned from the Maryland House of Delegates to serve as opioid strategy coordinator for Baltimore County Executive Johnny Olszewski.

== Birth ==
Eric Bromwell was born in Baltimore, Maryland on December 12, 1976.

== Education ==
Eric Bromwell received his education from the following institutions:

- Graduate Studies, University of Baltimore, 2000–present
- BA, English, Salisbury University, 1998

== Caucuses/Non-Legislative Committees ==
Eric Bromwell has been a member of the following committees:

- Member, Maryland Veterans Caucus, 2005–present
- Member, Maryland Legislative Sportsmens Caucus, 2003–present
- Chair, Baltimore County Delegation, 2007-2010
- Member, Joint Committee on the Selection of the State Treasurer, 2007
- Member, Joint Legislative Task Force on Universal Access to Quality and Affordable Health Care, 2005-2007
- Member, Maryland Medicaid Advisory Committee, 2004-2009

== Organizations ==
Eric Bromwell has been a member of the following organizations:

- Member, The Grunwald Club, 2009–present
- Member, Charles H. Hickey, Jr., School Advisory Board, 2005–present
- Member, Maryland Historical Society, 2005–present
- Member, Linwood Center Advisory Board, 2004–present
- President, Minte Home Owners Association, 2003–present
- Co-Chair, Allied Community Services, 2002–present
- Member, Baltimore County Civic and Social Club
- Member, Baltimore County Young Democrats
- Member, Parkville Jaycees
- Member, Perry Hall Middle School Parent-Teacher Association
- Board of Governors Member, Sixth District Democratic Club

== Background ==
Bromwell was born in Baltimore and raised Catholic. He attended Calvert Hall College High School and Salisbury University and worked in various capacities for the media corporation Comcast both before and after being elected to office.

== In the legislature ==
As of 2008, Bromwell is serving in his 2nd term in the Maryland House of Delegates, representing Maryland's District 8 in Baltimore County. Bromwell is a member of the Health and Government Operations Committee. In 2007 he was Elected Chairman of the Baltimore County Delegation.

=== Legislative notes ===
- voted for the Clean Indoor Air Act of 2007 (HB359)
- voted against in-state tuition for illegal immigrants in 2007 (HB6)

== Election results ==
- 2010 Race for Maryland House of Delegates – District 08

Voters to choose three:

Name	Votes	Percent	Outcome
Joseph C. Boteler III	21,427	19.49%	Won
John Cluster	19,237	17.5%	Won
Eric M. Bromwell	18,966	17.25%	Won
Ruth Baisden	18,223	16.57%	Lost
Norman Secoura	16,267	14.79%	Lost
Cal Bowman	15,757	14.33%	Lost
Other Write-Ins	80	0.1%	Lost

- 2006 Race for Maryland House of Delegates – District 08

Voters to choose three:

Name	Votes	Percent	Outcome
Eric M. Bromwell	20,116	17.9%	Won
Joseph C. Boteler III	19,586	17.4%	Won
Todd Schuler	18,356	16.3%	Won
Ruth Baisden	18,261	16.2%	Lost
Melissa Redmer Mullahey	18,160	16.1%	Lost
John W. E. Cluster Jr.	18,057	16.0%	Lost
Other Write-Ins	74	0.1%	Lost

- 2002 Race for Maryland House of Delegates – District 08

Voters to choose three:

Name	Votes	Percent	Outcome
Alfred W. Redmer Jr.	22,884	19.61%	Won
Eric M. Bromwell	20,314	17.41%	Won
Joseph C. Boteler III	19,826	16.99%	Won
Mike Rupp	18,755	16.07%	Lost
Tim Caslin	18,553	15.90%	Lost
Todd Schuler	16,277	13.95%	Lost
Other Write-Ins	86	0.07%	Lost
