= Donna M. Felling =

American politician and nurse (born 1950)

Member of the Maryland House of Delegates from the 8th district
- In office 1987–1990 Serving with Joseph Bartenfelder and William J. Burgess
- Preceded by: Dale Anderson

Personal details
- Born: March 10, 1950 (age 76) Baltimore, Maryland, U.S.
- Party: Democratic
- Education: University of Maryland (BSN); Johns Hopkins Bloomberg School of Public Health (MPH)
- Occupation: Politician; nurse

Donna M. Felling (born March 10, 1950) is an American politician and nurse from Maryland. She served as a member of the Maryland House of Delegates, representing District 8, from 1987 to 1990.

== Early life ==
Donna M. Felling was born on March 10, 1950, in Baltimore, Maryland. She attended Parkville High School and received a diploma in nursing from St. Agnes Hospital in 1970. She graduated from the University of Maryland with a Bachelor of Science in Nursing in 1980 and graduated from the Johns Hopkins Bloomberg School of Public Health with a Master of Public Health in 1986.

== Career ==
Around 1970, Felling started working as a public health nurse in Baltimore County.

Felling is a Democrat. Felling served as a member-at-large of the Democratic State Central Committee from 1984 to 1986. Felling was elected in 1986 to the Maryland House of Delegates, defeating incumbent Dale Anderson in the primary election. She served as a member of the Maryland House of Delegates, representing District 8, from 1987 to 1990. She was a member of the environmental matters committee. Felling was defeated in her bid for re-election for the District 8 seat in the Maryland House of Delegates in 1990. In 1994, Felling ran against incumbent Thomas L. Bromwell for the Democratic nomination in the Maryland Senate, but was defeated. In 2002, Felling ran for a District 7 seat in the Maryland House of Delegates, but lost in the general election.

In 1997, Felling was appointed as a member of the Baltimore County Board of Appeals by the Baltimore County Council.

Felling is a member of the American Nurses Association.

== Personal life ==
Felling is married. She lived in Perry Hall.
