= Joe Cluster =

American politician

Member of the Maryland House of Delegates from the 8th district
- In office September 6, 2016 – January 9, 2019
- Preceded by: John Cluster
- Succeeded by: Harry Bhandari

Personal details
- Born: July 5, 1979 (age 47) Baltimore, Maryland, U.S.
- Party: Republican

Joseph Corey Cluster (born July 5, 1979) is a former member of the Maryland House of Delegates, representing the 8th district in Baltimore County. He was appointed to fill the vacancy of former Delegate John Cluster, his father, on September 6, 2016. He married Kourtney Elizabeth Hamel, of Forest Hill, MD, on May 22, 2021.

== Education ==
Delegate Cluster graduated from Parkville High School in Northeast Baltimore County in 1997. He attend West Virginia University and Towson University where he received is BA in Social Science in 2002.

== Career ==
Delegate Cluster first got involved in politics interning for Congressman Bob Ehrlich during his last two years of college at Towson University. After graduating he was given the opportunity to run the Maryland Republican Party field operations for the 2002 election. Afterward, he went on to work for Lt. Governor Michael Steele as Director of External Affairs in his office until 2007.

In October 2013 he was named Executive Director of the Maryland Republican Party. The Party was $150,000 in debt and only had $10,000 cash on hand when he took over, but alongside Chairman Diana Waterman, Cluster helped raise over $1.8 million dollars the following year. This helped Larry Hogan win one of the biggest upset elections in the country in 2014. In 2016, Joe was appointed to fill the vacancy of former Delegate John Cluster, by Governor Larry Hogan.
