= Joseph Bartenfelder =

American politician (born 1957)

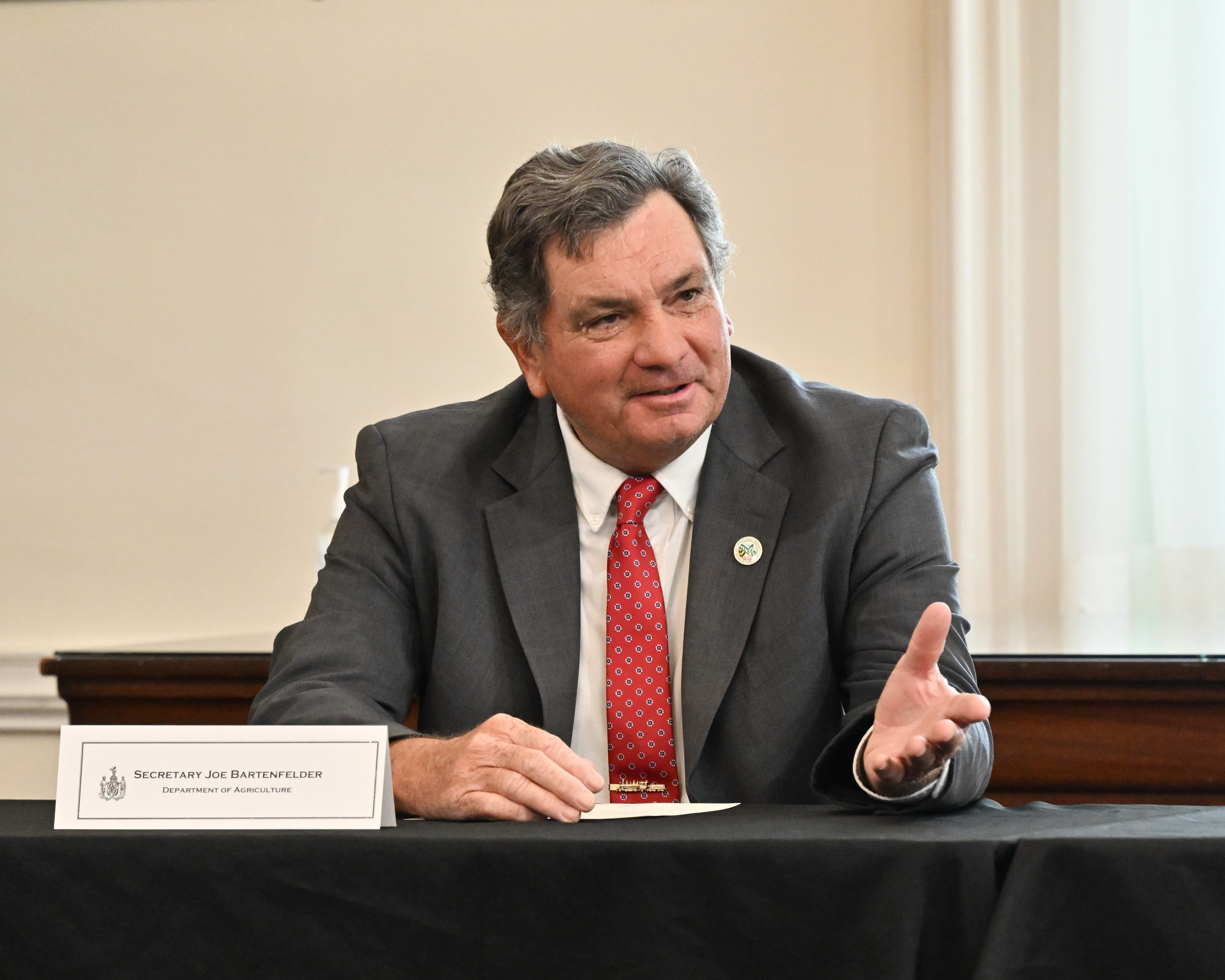
- Bartenfelder, 2022

Secretary of the Maryland Department of Agriculture
- In office February 13, 2015 – January 18, 2023
- Governor: Larry Hogan
- Deputy: Steve Connelly
- Preceded by: Earl F. Hance
- Succeeded by: Kevin Atticks

Member of the Baltimore County Council from District 6
- In office December 6, 1994 – December 6, 2010
- Succeeded by: Cathy Bevins

Member of the Maryland House of Delegates from the 8th district
- In office 1983–1994
- Preceded by: Louis L. DePazzo, Daniel J. Minnick, Jr., Robert R. Staab
- Succeeded by: Kathy Klausmeier

Personal details
- Born: January 3, 1957 (age 69) Baltimore, Maryland, U.S.
- Party: Democratic
- Children: 4
- Education: Towson University (BS)
- Occupation: Farmer

Joseph Bartenfelder (born January 3, 1957) is an American politician and farmer from Maryland. He was appointed Secretary of Agriculture for Maryland by then-Governor-elect Larry Hogan in 2014.

== Education ==
Bartenfelder graduated from St. Joseph School and Calvert Hall College High School. He earned a degree in business administration from Towson University.

== Career ==
In 1978, Bartenfelder ran for the Maryland House of Delegates for the first time. In 1982, he won his first state delegate seat and represented District 8 in the house until 1994.

In 1994, Bartenfelder began working on the Baltimore County Council. In 1996, he became chairman of the Baltimore County Council. He also served as chair of the Spending and Affordability Committee for four years while on the County Council.

In 2010, he ran in the primary to be Baltimore County Executive, which he lost to Kevin Kamenetz.

Bartenfelder was appointed Maryland Secretary of Agriculture by then-Governor-elect Larry Hogan in 2014.

== Personal life ==
Bartenfelder is married and has four children. On Thanksgiving, November 24, 2022, police charged him with hunting wetland or upland game birds “with the aid of bait or on or over any baited area,” which carries a minimum $500 fine and a maximum of $1500 for a first offense. Lauren Moses, public information officer for Natural Resources Police, could not say whether this was Bartenfelder’s first charge.
