= Chesapeake High School (Essex, Maryland) =

Coordinates: 39.2922°N 76.4195°W

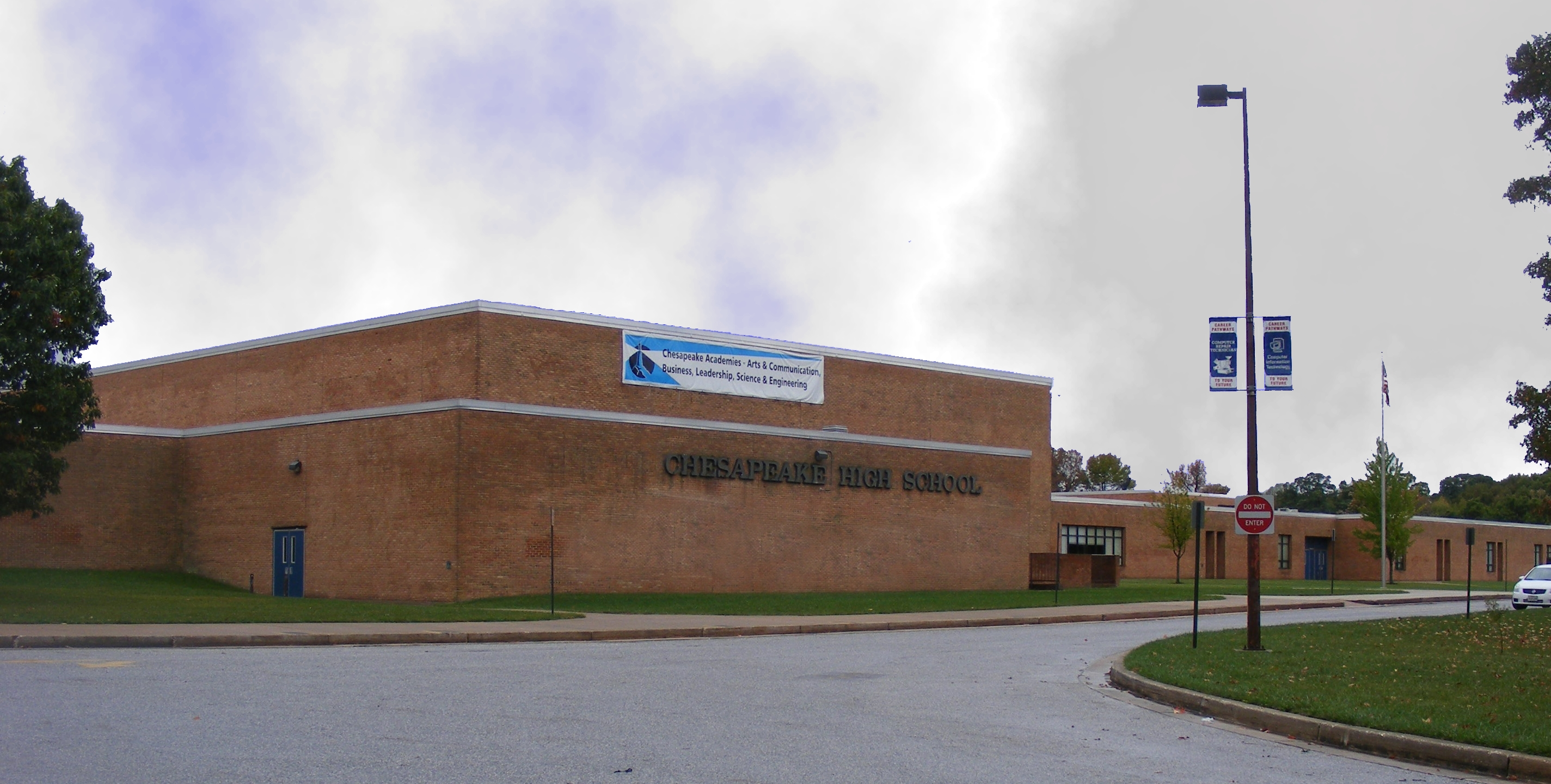
- CHS in 2007

Location
- 1801 Turkey Point Road; Essex, Maryland; United States

Information
- Type: Public high school
- Motto: We Obtain Whatever We Seek
- Established: 1978; 48 years ago
- School district: Baltimore County Public Schools
- NCES School ID: 240012000362
- Principal: Amy Tyler
- Teaching staff: 69 FTE (2022-23)
- Grades: 9–12
- Gender: Co-educational
- Enrollment: 1,047 (2022-23)
- Student to teacher ratio: 15.17 (2022-23)
- Campus: Suburban
- Colors: Dark blue and light blue
- Mascot: Bayhawks
- Website: chesapeakehs.bcps.org

Chesapeake High School (CHS), is a four-year public high school located in Essex, Maryland, United States, a suburb of Baltimore. It is part of the Baltimore County Public Schools system.

Chesapeake High School is one of two high schools in Maryland by that name, the other one being located in Anne Arundel County. The Chesapeake High School of Baltimore County is located in southeast corner of the county in Essex, Maryland. The school borders the school districts of Kenwood High School, Sparrows Point High School, Dundalk High School, and Patapsco High School. Widely known for its Virtual Lab and MCJROTC program. CHS is a Baltimore County Public School.

The high school is 196,204 square feet (18,227.9 m^{2}) on 49 acres (200,000 m^{2}).

== Academics ==
Chesapeake has recently added a Virtual Learning Environment. This is the first in the country. The school's name has become more widespread and known over the years. It is well known for having a highly successful Magnet program, the highlight being its Engineering Pathway. This pathway is endorsed by the nearby Lockheed Martin facility in Middle River, Maryland. In the last 10 years, the graduation rate at Chesapeake High School has been on a general downward trend. it was as high as 94% in 1997 and as low as 72% in 2003. The dropout rate is about 7%, a rate that is climbing.

About 15% of the students receive special services, a number considered high by Maryland Report Card.

High School Assessment test scores show the school to be performing well. In 2006, only 29.5% of the students passed algebra, 44.0% passed the biology test, 53.8% passed the government test, and 46.3% passed the English test. However, in 2011, 81.1% of students who took all 4 of the required HSA tests (Algebra/Data Analysis, Biology, Government, and English) have passed the tests.

== Extracurricular activities ==
=== Athletic state championships ===
- 1979 - Softball, Class B

=== Robotics ===
- 2012 - VEX Robotics, Mid-Atlantic Champions

== Notable alumni ==
- Christi Shake, Playboy model (real name Christina Fistek)
- Lamar King, NFL player
