= Kenwood High School (Maryland) =

Public high school in Essex, Maryland, United States

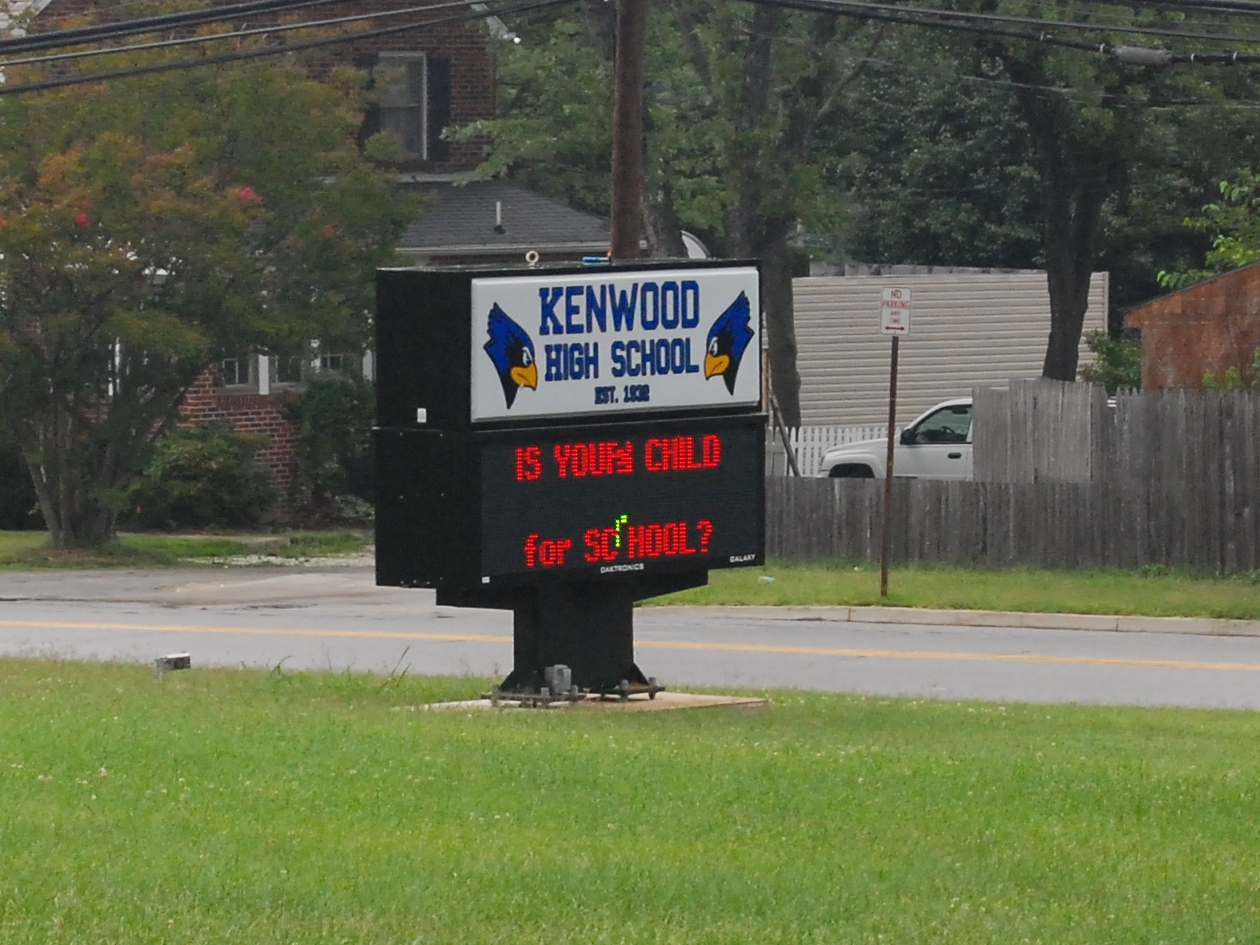

Location
- 501 Stemmers Run Road; Essex, (Baltimore County), Maryland 21221; United States; 39°19′33″N 76°27′44″W

Information
- Type: Public high school
- Motto: Knowledge, Honor, Service
- Established: 1931; 95 years ago
- School district: Baltimore County Public Schools
- Principal: Catherine Smith
- Teaching staff: 115(FTE) (2023–23)
- Grades: 9–12
- Enrollment: 1,908 (2022–23)
- Student to teacher ratio: 16.59:1 (2022–23)
- Campus: Suburban
- Colors: Blue; White; Grey; Black; Yellow
- Mascot: Bluebird
- Newspaper: Eye of the Bluebird
- Website: kenwoodhs.bcps.org

Kenwood High School is a Baltimore County public high school located in Essex, Maryland, United States.

== About the School ==
Kenwood has been educating students since 1931. The school was originally housed at 6700 Kenwood Avenue, Baltimore, MD 21237, which is now Golden Ring Middle School. The school was relocated to a larger building at 501 Stemmers Run Road, which is less than a mile away from Eastern Technical High School. The school borders the school districts of Overlea High School, Perry Hall High School, Chesapeake High School, and Dundalk High School. The design of the building is unusual, as the front of the school faces the schoolyard, unlike a majority that are in urban areas.

== Academics ==
Kenwood High school received a 39.6 out of a possible 90 points (43%) on the 2018-2019 Maryland State Department of Education Report Card and received a 2 out of 5 star rating, ranking in the 19th percentile among all Maryland schools.

== Students ==
The 2022–2023 enrollment at Kenwood High School was 1,908 students.

In October 2025, 16-year old black student Taki Allen was detained and handcuffed by armed police after an AI-driven security system, Omnilert, mistook his crumpled bag of tortilla chips for a gun.

=== Demographics ===
For the 2023–24 school year, Kenwood had 1,908 students. The enrollment was 45.9% Black, 30.6% White, 14.9% Hispanic, 5.9% two or more races, 2% Asian, and less than 1% Pacific Islander and Native American.

== Magnet Programs ==
While the school provides a standard diploma to graduates, there are also "Magnet programs," which are "theme-oriented courses of study that provide students with in-depth experiences in a specialized area of interest." Kenwood features two "magnets": International Baccalaureate (IB) and Sports Science Academy.

The "IB" program is recognized in more than 100 countries, welcoming students to a world of academic leadership and international opportunities. The courses offered in this program are competitive and challenging and encourage creative and critical thinking skills. The IB Program prepares students to take exit exams their senior year to earn college credit.

"SSA" provides students with the opportunity to pursue an interdisciplinary curriculum that investigates careers in the sports, health, and fitness fields, including Sports Medicine, Sports Education, Sports Business, Sports Marketing and Sports Communications

== Athletics ==
=== State championships ===
Boys Cross Country

- Class A 1956, 1958
- Class AA 1962, 1967

Field Hockey

- Class A 1947, 1948

Girls Soccer

- Pre MPSSAA (Field Ball) Class A 1946

Boys Soccer

- 4A 2003
- Steve Malone Sportsmanship Award 2003

Basketball

- Class A 1947

Baseball

- Class AA 1978

Boys Track and Field

- Class AA 1964
- CLASS AA 1989

== Notable alumni ==
- Donald B. Elliott, member, Maryland House of Delegates
- Anita Gillette (née Luebben), (1954), actress (stage, television, movies)
- Thomas David Jones, (1973), NASA astronaut
- Dennis F. Rasmussen, (1965), former Baltimore County Executive, Maryland State Senator.
- Michael H. Weir, Jr., member of Maryland House of Delegates
- Richard W. Metzgar, politician

== Image gallery ==
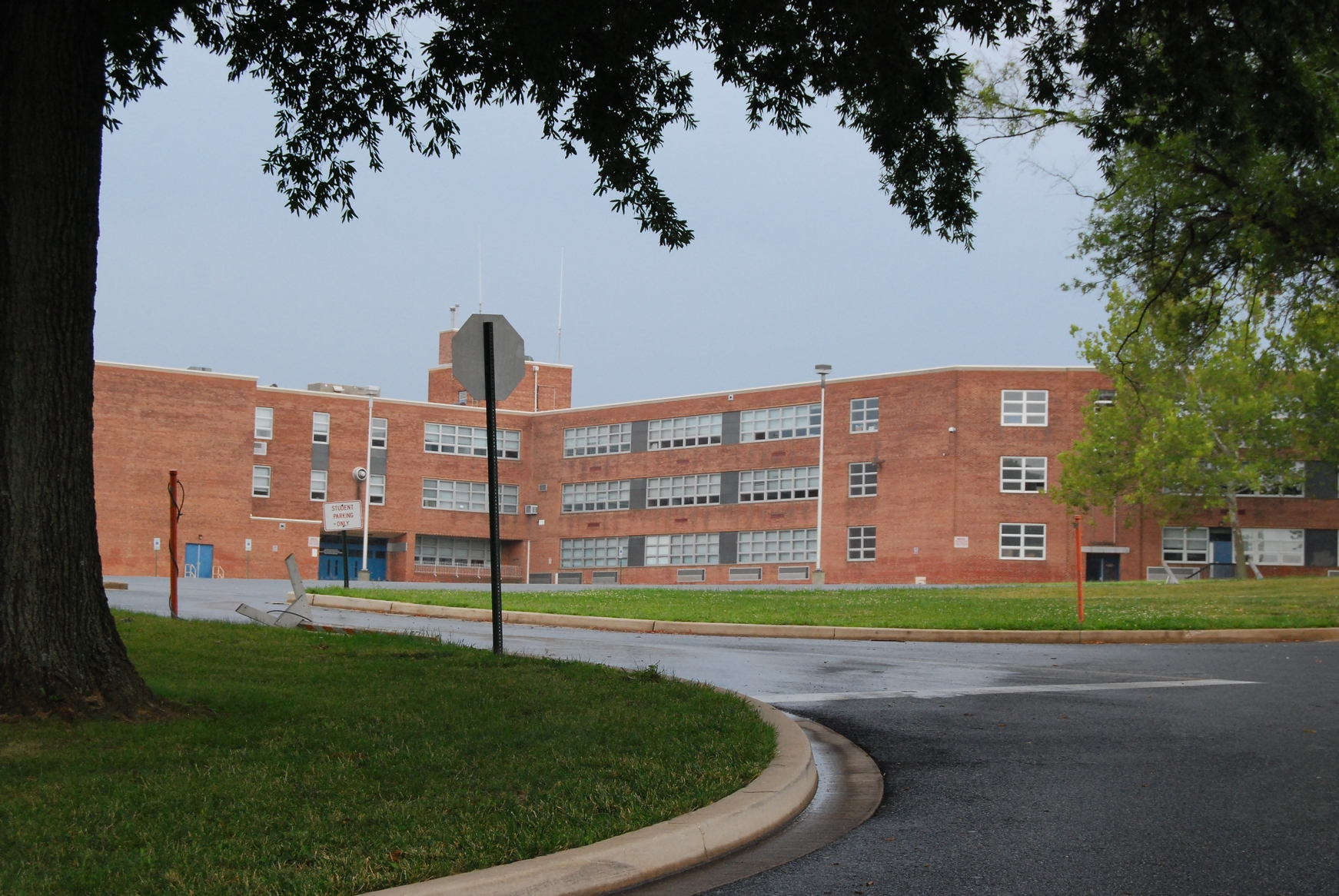
Entrance to the school parking lot

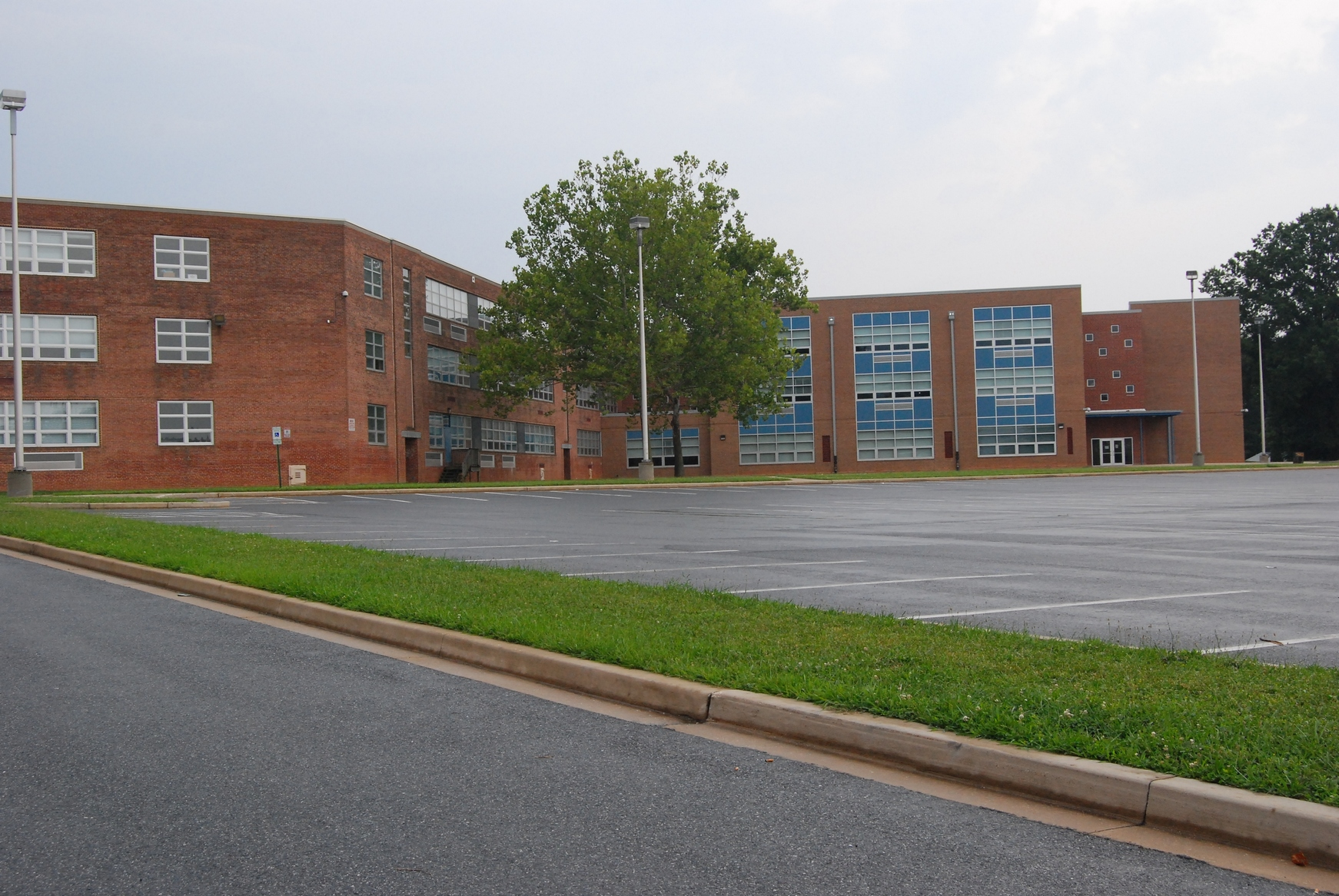
The school parking lot

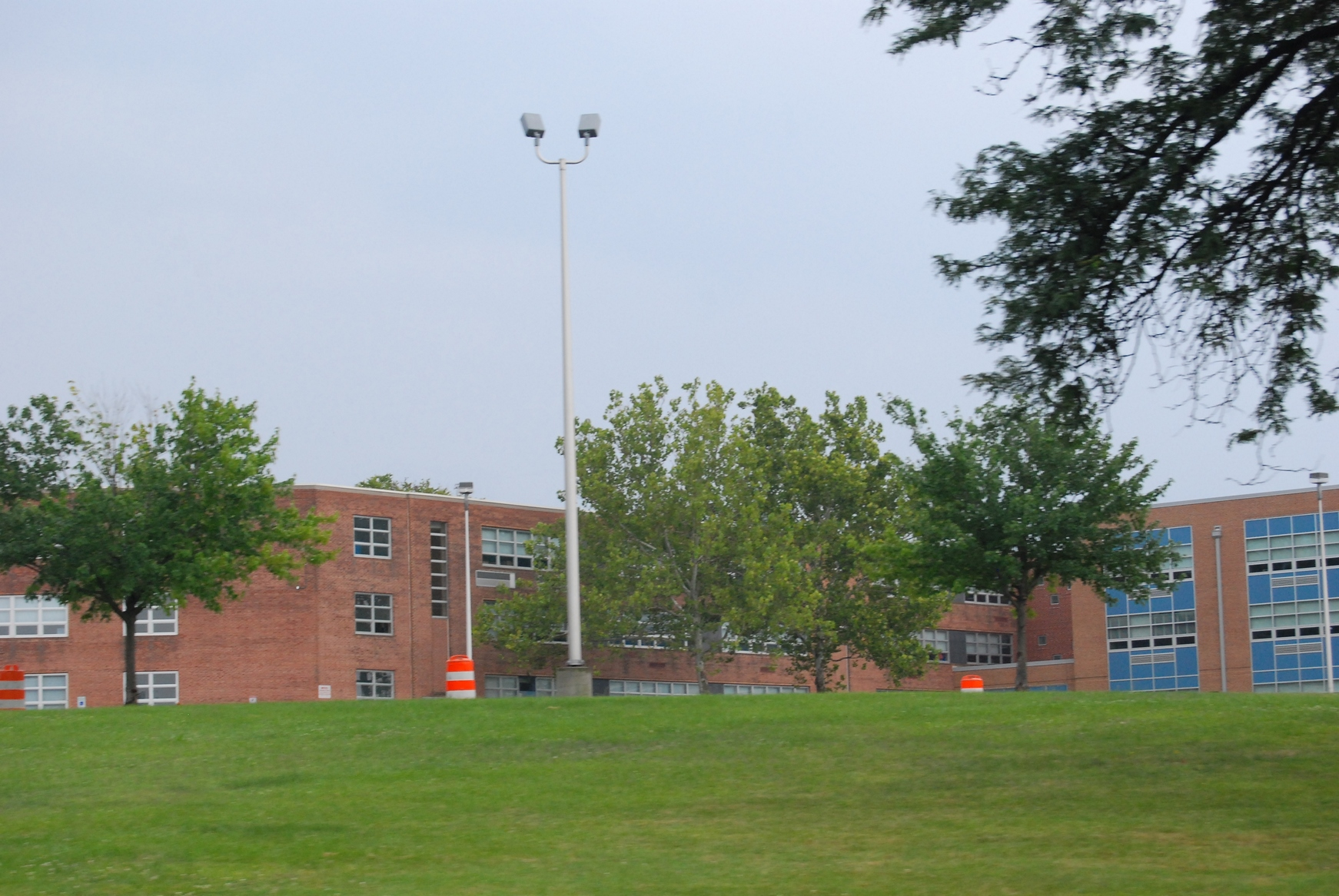
View from a small downhill

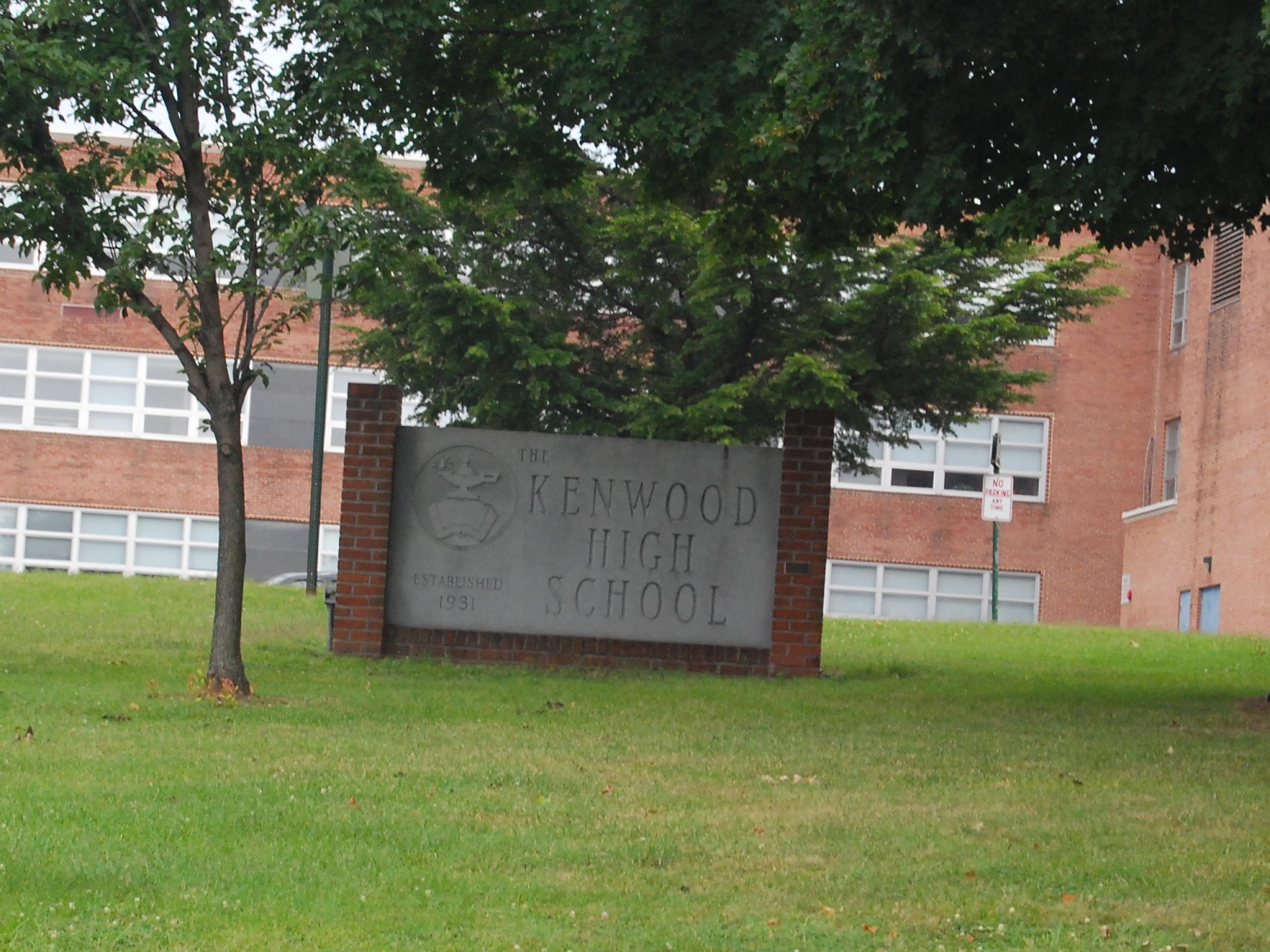
Note that this sign says the school was established in 1931, versus the other sign indicating 1932.

== See also ==
- List of high schools in Maryland
