= Parkville High School =

Coordinates: 39.3887°N 76.5393°W

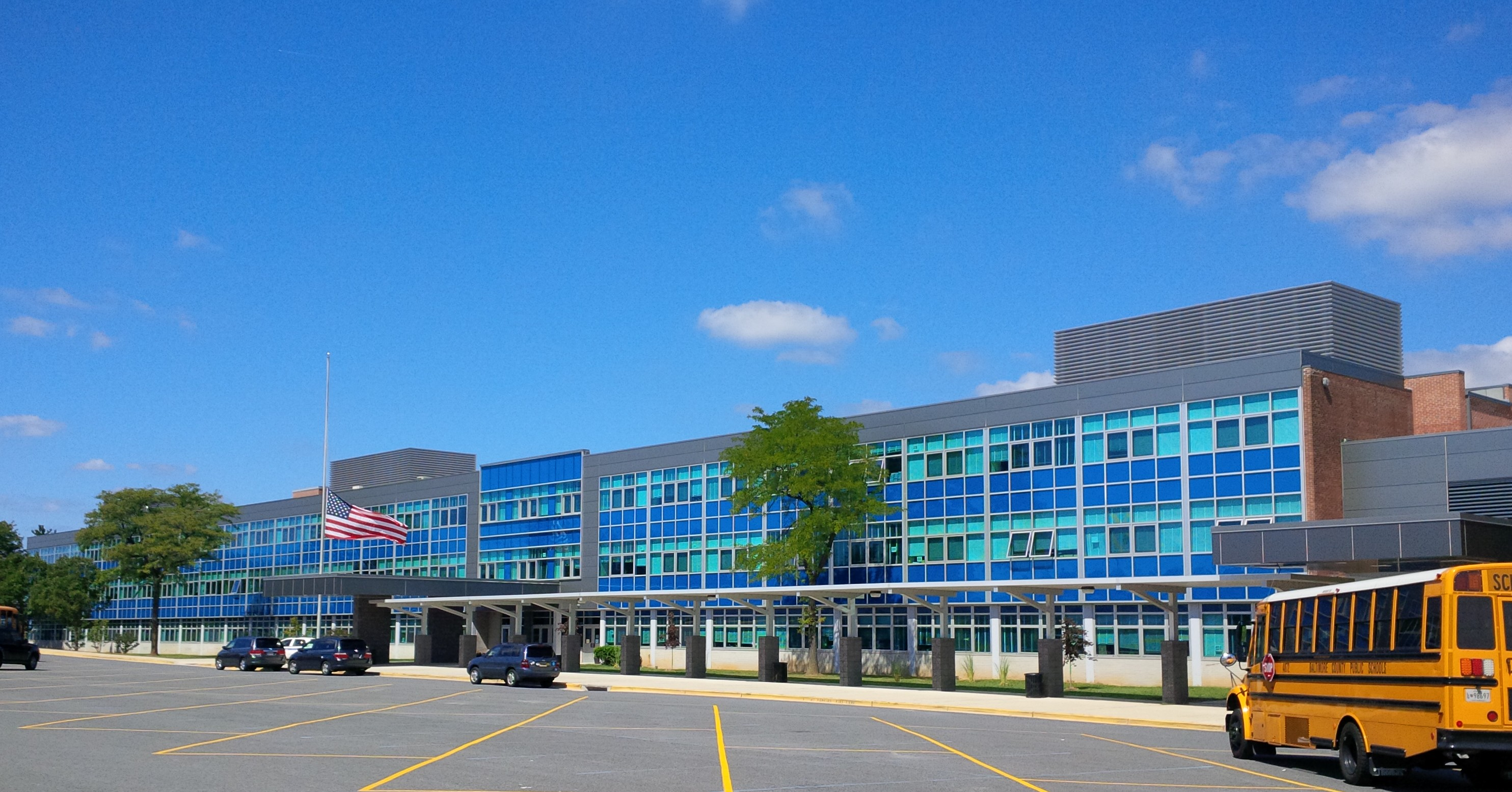

Location
- 2600 Putty Hill Avenue; Parkville, Maryland; United States

Information
- Type: Public
- Established: 1953
- School district: Baltimore County Public Schools
- Principal: Maureen Astarita
- Teaching staff: 152.41
- Grades: 9-12
- Enrollment: 2,200 (2022–23)
- Student to teacher ratio: 14.43
- Colors: Black; Gold
- Team name: Knights
- Website: parkvillehs.bcps.org

Parkville High School (PHS) is a four-year public high school in Baltimore County, Maryland, United States. The school was originally established in 1953 on what is now the location of Parkville Middle School. The current high school building opened in 1958. Area middle schools include Parkville Middle, Loch Raven Academy, and Pine Grove Middle.

== About the school ==
The school is located just northeast of Baltimore. It is on the inside of the Baltimore Beltway, on Putty Hill Avenue, just west of Harford Road Maryland Route 147, and east of Old Harford Road. Parkville High School at its current location opened in September 1958. The school boundaries border Towson High School, Loch Raven High School, Perry Hall High School, and Overlea High School.

In 2007, Parkville High School was named one of the best 1300 schools in America. An extensive, $40 million renovation project began in 2014 to air condition the building, refurbish the exterior, and remodel much of the interior space.

Parkville has a magnet program for mathematics, science, and computer science.

== Academics ==
Parkville High school received a 40.3 out of a possible 97 points (41%) on the 2018-2019 Maryland State Department of Education Report Card and received a 2 out of 5 star rating, ranking in the 16th percentile among all Maryland schools.

== Students ==
The 2022–2023 enrollment at Parkville High School was 2200 students.

== Athletics ==
=== State championships ===
Boys Basketball

- Class 4A 2023

Boys Cross Country

- Class A 1986

Girls Basketball

- Combined Class 1973

== Notable alumni ==
- Atif Qarni – Secretary of Education, Commonwealth of Virginia (2018–present)
- Artemy Lebedev – designer and businessman
- Maravene Loeschke – former president of Mansfield University & Towson University
- Michael G. Comeau – member of the Maryland House of Delegates (1997–99)
- Joe Cluster – member of the Maryland House of Delegates (2016–2019)
- Donna M. Felling – member of the Maryland House of Delegates
- Guy Guzzone – member of the Maryland House of Delegates and Maryland Senate (2007–2015, 2015–present)
- Dan Keplinger – artist who was featured in Oscar-winning documentary King Gimp
- Diane Geppi-Aikens – former women's lacrosse coach at Loyola College in Maryland
- Rusty Gerhardt – former professional Baseball pitcher for the San Diego Padres and current Texas Rangers Scout
- Kevin Palmer – former NBA player for the Washington Wizards and current international player
- Emil B. Pielke – former member of the Maryland House of Delegates

== See also ==
- List of Schools in Baltimore County, Maryland
