= Overlea High School =

Overlea High

Location
- 5401 Kenwood Ave; Baltimore County, Maryland 21206-1499; United States; 39.3493°N 76.5110°W

Information
- Type: Public high school
- Opened: 1961
- School district: Baltimore County Public Schools
- Principal: Monica C Sample
- Grades: 9-12
- Hours in school day: 7:30 - 2:30
- Campus: Suburban
- Campus size: 29 acres (120,000 m^{2})
- Colours: Blue and orange
- Mascot: Falcons
- Rival: Kenwood
- Website: overleahs.bcps.org
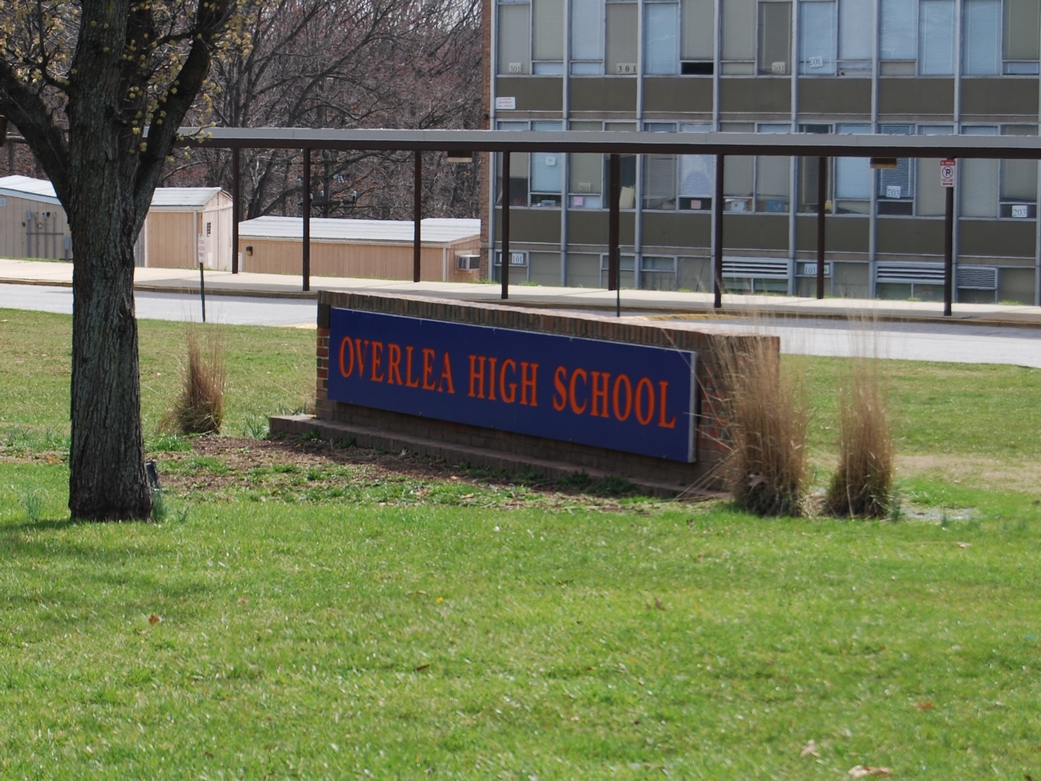

Overlea High School (OHS) is a four-year public high school in Baltimore County, Maryland, United States. The school was opened in 1961.

== About the school ==
The original building was constructed in the early-1960s. The main structure is 124,266 sq ft (11,544.7 m^{2}). It is located on Kenwood Avenue in eastern Baltimore County near the I-695 and I-95 interchange. Though in an unincorporated part of the county, it serves the areas of White Marsh, Rosedale, Overlea, and Fullerton.

Overlea's school district borders Parkville High School, Perry Hall High School, Kenwood High School, and Dundalk High School.

== Academics ==
Overlea High school received a total earned points percentage of 41.1% on the 2024-2025 Maryland State Department of Education Report Card and received a 2 out of 5 star rating, ranking in the 9th percentile among all Maryland schools.

== Students ==
The 2019–2020 enrollment at Overlea High School was 1,474 students.

The graduation rate at Overlea has been steady at 80-85% over the past 10 years.

Student population
1993	1994	1995	1996	1997	1998	1999	2000	2001	2002	2003	2004	2005	2006	2007	2008	2009
1,081	1,129	1,097	1,035	1,030	983	1,048	1,152	1,128	1,173	1,199	1,180	1,180	1,247	1,339	1,268	1,210

=== Demographic ===
Based on current enrollment information, there are approximately 1,500 students that attend Overlea High School. There are 430 students in the ninth grade, 405 students in the tenth grade, 369 in the eleventh grade, and 332 in the twelfth grade.

=== Ethnicity distribution ===
Of the 1,230 students that attend Overlea High School, 808 (65.7%) of them are Black or African American, 25 (2.1%) are Asian American, 77 (6.3%) are Hispanic or Latino, 279 (22.7%) are White, and 38 (3.1%) are other.

=== Gender distribution ===
Of the 1,230 students, there are 553 (45%) girls and 676 (55%) boys.

== Athletics ==
=== State championships ===
Boys Soccer

- One Class 1971
- Pre-MPSSAA Class A 1948

Wrestling

- Group:
  - Class 2A-1A Dual Meet 1999

Softball

- Class AA 1981

== Notable alumni ==
- Bernard Hopkins, (1992) is a professional basketball player in Spain's Liga ACB.
- Dave Johnson (1977), former Major League pitcher, currently a broadcaster for MASN
- Jamie Miller (1993) drummer for Bad Religion, guitarist/drummer for ...And You Will Know Us by the Trail of Dead, theSTART, drummer for Snot
- Mike Riley, (1993) is an American cartoonist best known as the creator of the webcomic, I Taste Sound
- Mike Rowe, (1980) is an American media personality. He is the host of the Discovery Channel's Dirty Jobs, as well as narrator for other programs on the Discovery Channel

== References and notes ==
- See also List of Schools in Baltimore County, Maryland
