= Keplinger =

Keplinger is a surname. Notable people with the surname include:

- Dan Keplinger (born 1973), American artist
- Gregg Keplinger, American drummer
