= Chesapeake High School =

Chesapeake High School may refer to:

- Chesapeake High School (Anne Arundel County), a high school in Pasadena, Maryland, United States
- Chesapeake High School (Baltimore County), a high school in Essex, Maryland, United States
- Chesapeake High School (Ohio), a high school in Chesapeake, Ohio, United States
