= Patapsco High School and Center for the Arts =

Coordinates: 39.26496°N 76.48652°W

Patapsco High School and Center For The Arts
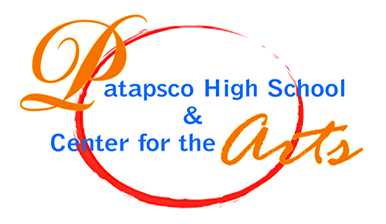

Location
- 8100 Wise Avenue; Dundalk, Maryland; United States

Information
- Type: Public Secondary
- Motto: Work Hard, Be Nice!
- Established: 1963
- School district: Baltimore County Public Schools
- Principal: Scott Rodriguez-Hobbs
- Grades: 9–12
- Enrollment: 1,469
- Campus: Suburban
- Colors: Red, White and Blue
- Mascot: Patriot
- Accreditation: Middle States Association of Colleges and Secondary Schools; Maryland State Department of Education
- Website: Official website

Patapsco High School and Center For The Arts is a public high school in the United States, located in Dundalk in Baltimore County, Maryland, near Baltimore.

== About the School ==
Patapsco is located in the suburban community of Dundalk, in southeastern Baltimore County. The school boundaries include the north side of Wise Avenue, Langport Rd., Inverness Rd., and North Boundary Road. The building and adjacent fields occupy an entire city block in the Gray Haven neighborhood, just north of the West Inverness neighborhood. Built in 1963, the single-story building has a maximum capacity of 2000 students. The original students in September, 1963 included sophomores and juniors. The first graduating class was in 1965. The serving area of Patapsco borders the serving areas of Sparrows Point High School to the south and east, as well as Dundalk High School to the west. In addition, students from throughout Baltimore County may also apply to the magnet programs, which include Visual Arts, Literary Arts, Dance, Instrumental Music, Theatre, Theatre Tech, and Vocal Music.

== Academics ==
Patapsco High school received a 40.3 out of a possible 97 points (52%) on the 2018-2019 Maryland State Department of Education Report Card and received a 3 out of 5 star rating, ranking in the 32nd percentile among all Maryland schools.

== Students ==
The 2019–2020 enrollment at Patapsco High School and Center for the Arts was 1434 students.

The current graduation rate for the school is 89.68%. Enrollment at the school is currently leveling off at just under 1500, down from a 19-year high of 1650 in 2006.

== Athletics ==
=== State championships ===
Boys Soccer

- Class 2A 1976, 1977, 1995

== Magnet Program ==
Patapsco incorporated a performing and visual arts magnet in 1995, and has since become a leader in the state for its programs in vocal and instrumental music, performance and technical theatre, dance, and visual art. Students are required to audition for these magnet programs the year prior to attending. Patapsco was recently one of five schools in the nation to be awarded the John F. Kennedy Center for the Performing Arts School of Excellence in Arts Education. The individual programs have also won numerous awards and championships locally, regionally, and nationally.

== Notable alumni ==
- Ron Franklin, former Eclipse Award winning jockey
- John O'May, Australia-based actor, who later also taught at the School
