= Ballestone Mansion =

Historic house in Maryland

- U.S. National Register of Historic Places
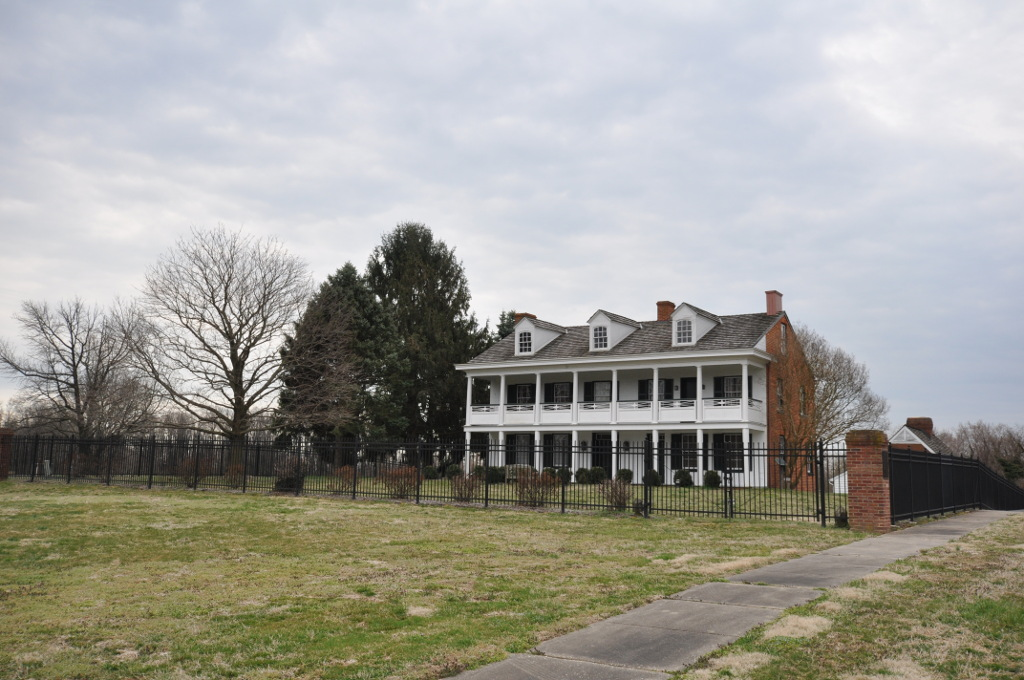

- Location within Maryland Location within the United States
- Location: East of Essex on Back River Neck Rd. in Rocky Point Park, Essex, Maryland
- Coordinates: 39°15′8″N 76°25′3″W
- Area: 5 acres (2.0 ha)
- Built: 1800
- NRHP reference No.: 75000866
- Added to NRHP: June 18, 1975

The Ballestone-Stansbury House, once misidentified as the Ballestone Mansion, is a historic plantation home located on Cedar Point between Back and Middle Rivers in Essex, Baltimore County, Maryland, United States. It is a part of the Rocky Point Park and is owned by Baltimore County. It was built during the late 18th or early 19th century and has been enlarged twice. The original portion was built about 1800.

A one-story addition added 506 square feet to the house. A second floor was added to the addition c. 1870–1880.

Ballestone Mansion was listed on the National Register of Historic Places on June 18, 1975.
