= Mike Riley (cartoonist) =

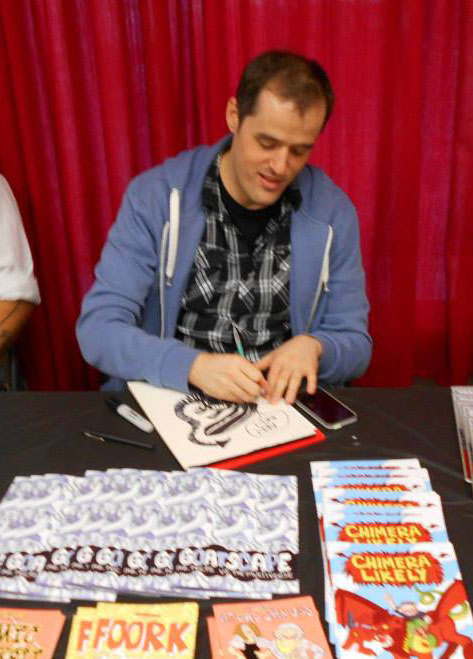
- Born: Mike Riley; October 22, 1975 (age 50); Baltimore, Maryland, United States
- Education: Towson University (BA)
- Occupations: Writer and Cartoonist
- Years active: 2005—present
- Website: www.mikerileycomics.com

Mike Riley (born October 22, 1975) is an American cartoonist and comic book writer currently residing in Baltimore, Maryland. He is best known as the creator of the single-panel webcomic I Taste Sound and the comic series Irregulordz.

== Biography ==
Riley graduated from Overlea High School in Baltimore. From 1997 to 1999 he studied Painting at Towson University, where he won several awards including the William Denner Painting Award.

He began exhibiting paintings and digital illustrations in 2005, as well as producing album and poster art for various musicians. His work at the time was described by the German magazine, Synthetics, as "dark" and "reminiscent of Skinny Puppy".

Riley founded the Lo-Fi Social Club gallery and performance space in Baltimore's Station North Arts and Entertainment District in September 2007. The club hosted numerous emerging musicians including Dan Deacon, Parts & Labor, The Death Set, Wye Oak and Matt & Kim before ceasing operations in Spring of 2009. Upon Lo-Fi's closing, Riley transitioned the space into a volunteer-run, nonprofit art collective known as The Hexagon continuing to organize art exhibitions and feature local and touring musicians. The club was one of only two such venues in the United States to publicly boycott music licensed by ASCAP, BMI, and SESAC.

In 2010 Riley launched the webcomic I Taste Sound, posting new work online several times a week along with numerous publications based on the web content.

At the 2012 Baltimore Comic-Con Riley sponsored an unsuccessful campaign to make Hira-Shuriken Maryland's Official State Throwing-Star, distributing literature on the topic and collecting signatures for eventual submission to the Office of the Governor of Maryland.

Riley's cartoons appeared in several newspapers including the Augusta Metro Spirit and the Chattanooga Pulse and regularly in the Baltimore Sun Media Group's daily paper, b. He was a frequent contributor to Atomic Books' online funny page, Mutant Funnies.

Riley continues to promote local artists and musicians. Frequent collaborators include Washington, D.C. band Imperial China, rapper Height Keech, and the production duo Necessary People.

In 2026 Riley became a partner in a wealth management firm where he specializes in consulting on qualified retirement plans as a registered investment advisor, Certified Plan Fiduciary Advisor, and Qualified 401(k) Administrator as certtified by the American Society of Pension Professionals & Actuaries.

== Comics ==
=== I Taste Sound ===
Lawn & Garden Special Victims Unit (vol. 1) #1 (September 2012)

I Taste Sound launched on April Fools' Day 2010. It was originally updated daily then moved to a semi-weekly format. The site was on hiatus from December 21, 2012 until June 2013 when weekly posts resumed. Riley explains that the comics, drawn with a tablet and stylus, began as a distillation of the humorous elements contained in his paintings. Riley sites the work of Ben Edlund as early comic inspiration. A letter from Riley appears in the first printing of the second issue of Edlund's original comic book series The Tick. He also cites 1980s animation and the television being on all day as influences.

Each panel usually contains a jagged block of color with the site url written in the margin. The visual style was described by the Baltimore City Paper as "messy and bright, almost like Riley drew them drunk or with his non-dominant hand". The palette of early posts was limited to red, black and white later incorporating yellow, skin tones and occasional collage.

The panels look to employ wordplay, irony, visual puns and non sequiturs to humorous effect. Subject matter ranges from simple text and diagrams to inanimate objects or awkwardly interacting characters. In addition to semi-weekly single panel posts, the site hosts occasional sequential art projects with reoccurring characters, such as Riley's 24-Hour Comic Book Day entry Peener Sticks World Cup and numerous spin-offs including Mr. Peeps Does America and Lawn & Garden: Special Victims Unit.

I Taste Sound Volume 1: The Sword of Reason, 2011 (ISBN 978-0-615-47243-0) a 96-page collection of highlights from the first eight months of the site, was published in April 2011. When asked about the book's dark humor for a January 2012 interview with Baltimore Comic Books Examiner, Riley stated that "Other than a handful of accidentally drowned prairie dogs, some fondu burns and a stabbing, I don't think of the book as dark."

=== Goatscape ===
Goatscape - Mr. Peeps vs. The Multiverse is a surreal, adventure, comedy comic series which follows the misadventures of a goat named Mr. Peeps and his companions; a talking dead fish and frequently unclothed Uncle Gary as they passively search for a lost sword. Each issue sees the easily distracted, often oblivious, trio narrowly avert disaster. Other key characters include fast food chain night manager Melinda Hernandex and the renegade professional wrestling tag team Montpelier Funk. Mr. Peeps is intermittently pursued by a sinister anthropomorphic bear named Ranger Rodney, emissaries of the Prairie Dog Kingdom and a series of bizarre interdimensional crime bosses who see him as a threat to them obtaining the lost sword.

The series uses a limited pallet with shades of purple and grayscale. Puzzles, games and mazes are interspersed throughout the story and the covers are often unconventional, featuring abstract imagery, tessellations and optical illusions in support of the surreal themes. In an interview with Dan Keech, Riley revealed that the three main characters originally appeared in separate I Taste Sound panels, between 2010 and 2011.

=== Commuters ===
Commuters is a science fiction, humor comic series created in collaboration with writer David Crispino. The traffic themed stories incorporating elements of horror and surrealism with unexpected twist ran from April 2013 to September 2015.
