= Diane Geppi-Aikens =

American lacrosse coach

- Geppi-Aikens in 2002
- Born: Diane Geppi; October 4, 1962; Baltimore, Maryland, U.S.
- Died: June 29, 2003 (aged 40); Baltimore, Maryland, U.S.
- Cause of death: Brain tumor
- Employer: Loyola College Maryland
- Known for: Lacrosse coach

Diane Geppi-Aikens (October 4, 1962 – June 29, 2003) was an athlete and later a women's lacrosse coach at Loyola College (currently Loyola University Maryland). During her tenure as coach of Loyola College, the team made 10 appearances at NCAA tournaments, with Geppi-Aikens being named "Coach of the Year" three times.

Geppi-Aikens died of terminal cancer in 2003. She was inducted into the Lacrosse Hall of Fame in 2015.

== Athletic career ==
Beginning at a young age, Geppi was driven athletically. As a youth, she was one of 2 young girls playing football and baseball on the local boys' teams.... She attended Parkville High School, where she would earn Baltimore "All—Metro" honors in volleyball, basketball, and lacrosse. These athletic accolades led her to be recruited by several colleges, and was offered a number of scholarships to play collegiate basketball. For college, Geppi decided to attend nearby Loyola College where she could remain close to her family. Although recruited to play three sports, Geppi decided to play only volleyball and lacrosse. In lacrosse, Geppi was usually an offensive player. However, in her sophomore year, she suffered a nerve injury which required her to change positions. Geppi converted to goalkeeper. The conversion was a success, Geppi would go on to earn All-American honors as a goalkeeper. After college, Geppi continued playing lacrosse, where she helped Team USA win two gold medals in international competition.

Geppi was named captain of both the volleyball and lacrosse teams during her playing career. In 1984, Geppi was inducted into the Loyola College Athletic Hall of Fame. She was the youngest person ever to be honored with this induction.

== Coaching career ==
Geppi-Aikens became the head coach of the Loyola Greyhounds women's lacrosse team in 1989. During her career she amassed a 197–71 record and led the team to the NCAA Women's Lacrosse Championship tournament ten times. She earned NCAA Division I "Coach of the Year" honors three times, in 1996, 1997, and 2003. Geppi-Aikens also served as Loyola's volleyball coach from 1984 to 1990, and was assistant athletic director for a time. In 2001, during a period a remission from her cancer, Geppi-Aikens was inducted into the U.S. Lacrosse Greater Baltimore Chapter Hall of Fame.

After battling cancer since 1995, Geppi-Aikens learned prior to the 2003 season that the brain tumor had returned and this time it was inoperable. Despite being paralyzed by the cancer and using a wheelchair Geppi-Aikens continued to coach her team to the nation's # 1 ranking. The Greyhounds advanced to the Final Four of the NCAA Women's Lacrosse Championship tournament before their season ended with a 5–3 loss.

In 2003, the National Collegiate Athletic Association (NCAA) awarded Geppi-Aikens with the Inspiration Award. This award is presented to an individual who gives hope and inspiration to others.

== Cancer ==
Geppi-Aikens first learned that she had brain cancer in 1995. She had surgery to remove the tumor. Treatment did not prevent the tumor from coming back, and she again had surgery in 1997, 1998, and 2001. In December 2002, she learned that the cancer had again come back, and this time the tumor was inoperable. After the final diagnosis and being told she had only months to live, she stated that she had two goals. She wrote in a Sports Illustrated article entitled No Time To Die that she wanted to see her son graduate high school, and to coach her team to play for the national championship. She died on June 29, 2003, just one month after her son's graduation and coaching the Loyola women's lacrosse team to the NCAA Championship Final Four.

== Legacy ==
The Intercollegiate Women's Lacrosse Coaches Association (IWLCA) presents annually the Diane Geppi-Aikens Memorial Award recognizing lifetime achievement in contribution to women’s lacrosse. Also, annually at the Tewaaraton Trophy presentation, an award given to the nation's top male and female collegiate lacrosse players, the Diane Geppi-Aikens Scholarship is presented. This scholarship was created to honor the women’s college lacrosse player who displays the same leadership, character and perseverance as exhibited by Geppi-Aikens.

In 2004, Chip Silverman wrote a book called, Lucky Every Day: 20 Unforgettable Lessons from a Coach Who Made a Difference recalling stories and events of Geppi-Aikens' life and its effect on her players and those that surrounded her. In her honor, main athletic fields at Loyola College have been renamed the Diane Geppi-Aikens Field. In addition, the college holds the annual Diane Geppi-Aikens Memorial 5k Race.

== Personal life ==
Geppi was born in Baltimore County, Maryland in 1962 to John and Katherine Geppi. She was one of three children. She was a mother of four. She had one son, Michael, and three daughters, Jessica, Melissa, and Shannon. A single mother, she raised her four children mostly on her own, after she divorced in 1995.
