= Essex, Maryland =

Census-designated place in Maryland, United States

- Census-designated place
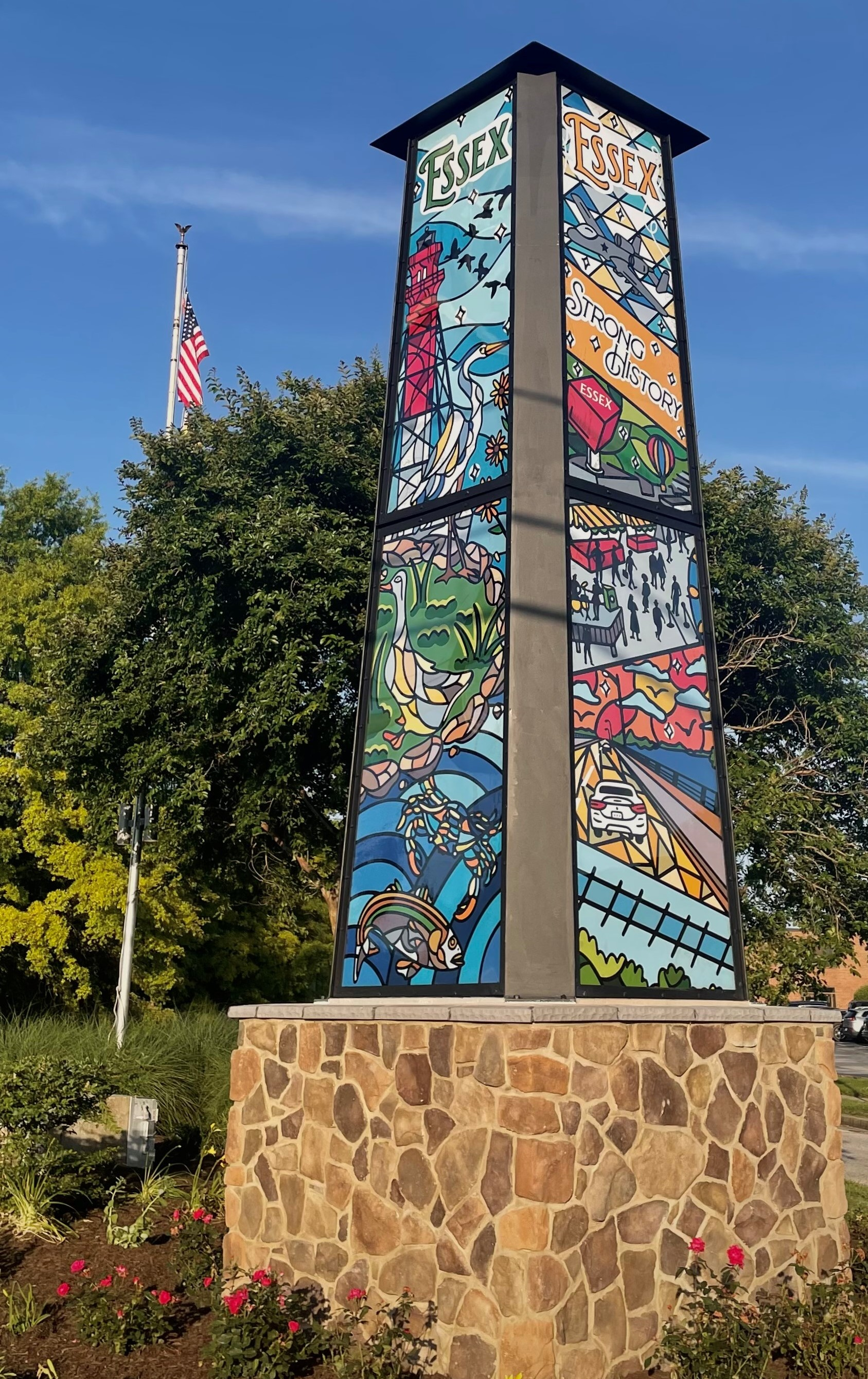
- Essex Monolith, Essex, Maryland

- Location of Essex, Maryland
- Coordinates: 39°18′28″N 76°27′6″W
- Country: United States
- State: Maryland
- County: Baltimore

Area
  - Total: 12.04 sq mi (31.19 km^{2})
  - Land: 9.26 sq mi (23.98 km^{2})
  - Water: 2.78 sq mi (7.20 km^{2})
- Elevation: 39 ft (12 m)

Population (2020)
  - Total: 40,505
  - Density: 4,374.4/sq mi (1,688.96/km^{2})
- Time zone: UTC−5 (Eastern (EST))
  - Summer (DST): UTC−4 (EDT)
- ZIP code: 21221
- Area codes: 410, 443, 667
- FIPS code: 24-26600
- GNIS feature ID: 0590171

Essex is an unincorporated community and census-designated place in Baltimore County, Maryland, United States. Essex history dates back to 1909. The population was 40,505 in the 2020 census, up from 39,262 in the 2010 census.

== History ==
Essex is located on a peninsula bodied by the Middle River to the east and the Back River to the west. Essex was originally ten blocks, running from Mace Avenue to Marlyn Avenue. It began in 1909 by the Taylor Land Company for the residents in Baltimore who wanted a place outside the city limits to perhaps grow a garden or to pursue some other rural activity. Land was cheap, and sales were enhanced by a promotional pamphlet.

Henry Guttenberger built the first general store in Essex in 1910 on the corner of Eastern Boulevard and Mace Avenue. Between 1911 and 1912, the Taylor Land Company donated the lots for Essex Methodist and St. John's Lutheran churches. They also donated the land where the volunteer fire department built their station. The permanent fire station opened in 1921.

With the ever-growing population came the need to build schools. The elementary school opened in 1925 with 400 students. Essex Community College, now CCBC-Essex, was founded in 1957. Classes were first held at Kenwood High School, with fifty part-time and nine full-time students. In 1961, the college moved to Dorsey Avenue, and in 1968 moved to its present location, in Rossville. This site was owned by the Mace family, and the family burial plot is maintained and protected by the college.

A fire in August 1957 destroyed an entire block of businesses on Eastern Boulevard, and the town's business district never fully recovered from that catastrophe. The ten-alarm blaze caused a half million dollars in damages, in the time it took to repair the buildings new shopping centers were built changing the buying habits of consumers.

The Glenn L. Martin Company was the single biggest reason for the rapid growth of the area. Employment at the company peaked at more than 53,000 workers during World War II. In the years following, industry in the area dwindled, and much of the original Glenn L. Martin facility became the property of the State, including Martin State Airport. The remaining aerospace business followed a progression of corporate mergers and today is owned and operated by Lockheed Martin.

Another important company was Eastern Rolling Mill, which opened in 1919. The plant, at the head of the Back River, produced carbon sheet steel. In 1944, Eastern merged with Industrial Stainless Steel, Inc. to form Easco. The plant then merged with the British company Avesta-Sheffield in the early 1990s, finally shutting down operations in the late 1990s.

Today, there is interest in revitalizing Essex by including it in government-sponsored empowerment zones. Many neighborhoods have begun a "clean-up" of their areas, hoping to transform Essex into a place that will be ready to move into the twenty-first century. Improvements include removal of run-down, low-income housing, including the Tall Trees Community, Edgewater apartments, and the Riverdale Community; new medians and pavement on Eastern Boulevard; a new Essex monolith replaced the old Essex cube, and new developments being built around the town.

Ballestone Mansion (Ballestone-Stansbury House) built in 1800 was listed on the National Register of Historic Places in 1975.

The town has a strip of shops known as the business district on Eastern Boulevard starting from Virginia Avenue to Marlyn Avenue. The business district originally started from Mace Avenue to Marlyn Avenue. Its largest shopping center, Middlesex, was built in 1955 which once had a department store Montgomery Ward and grocery store Food Fair as anchors of the shopping center.

On August 2, 2009, the community of Essex celebrated its 100th birthday with a party at Cox's Point Park on Riverside Drive.

Sources: Baltimore County Public Library

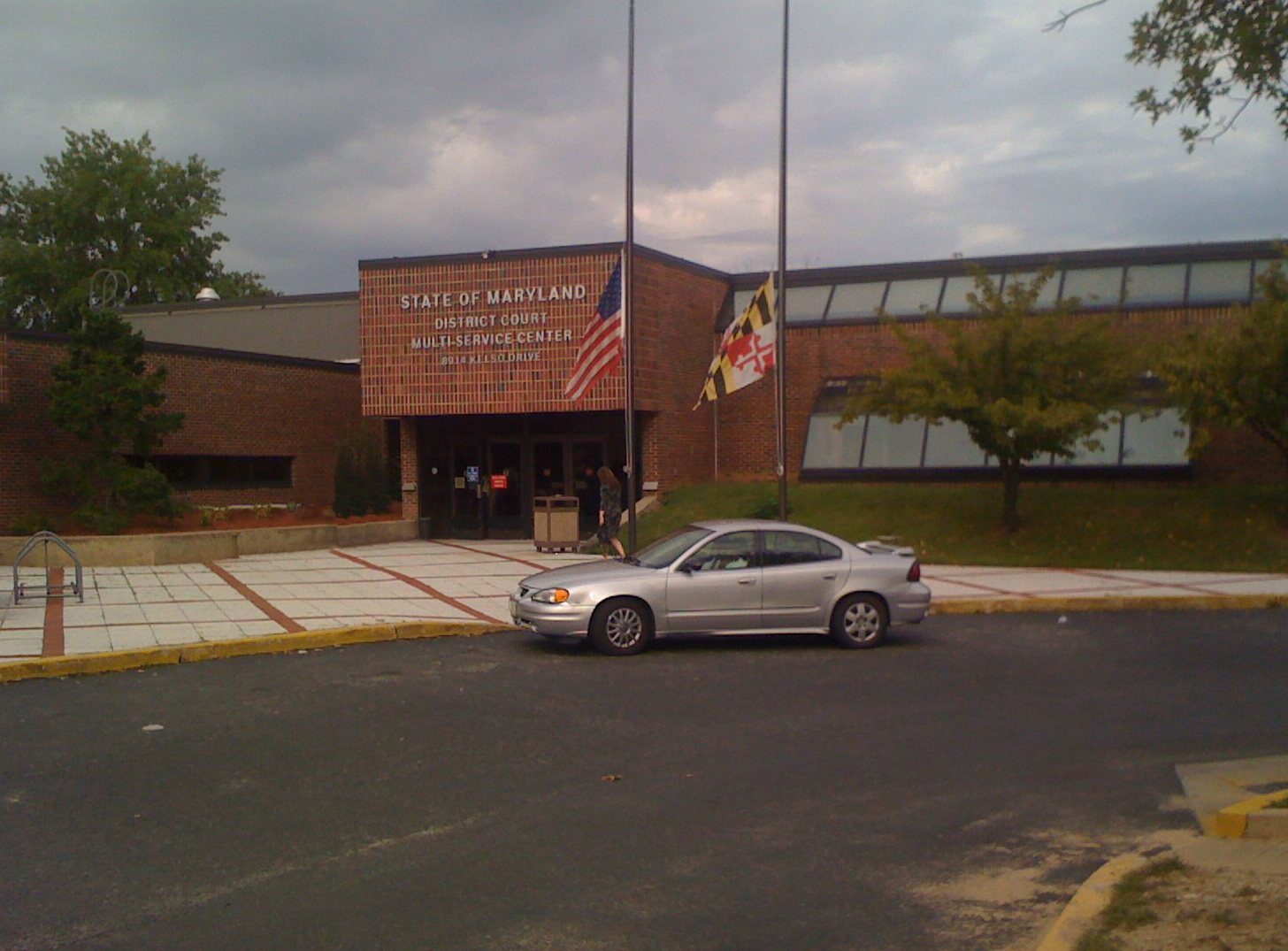
Essex district court

== Geography ==
Essex is located at 39°18′28″N 76°27′6″W (39.307737, −76.451710).

According to the United States Census Bureau, the CDP has a total area of 11.9 square miles (30.8 km^{2}), of which 9.3 square miles (24.0 km^{2}) is land and 2.6 square miles (6.8 km^{2}), or 22.16%, is water.

The town is on mostly flat to gently rolling terrain, transitioning to marshland at the tip of the peninsula close to the Chesapeake Bay. Essex has a small island on the Chesapeake Bay named Hart Miller Island. The island is only accessible by boat, and the closest boat launch is located in Rocky Point. The island boasts an observation tower, beaches, and hiking trails. A made landfill linking two Chesapeake islands consisting of Hart and Miller island.

== Demographics ==
Historical population
Census	Pop.	Note	%±
1960	35,205		—
1970	38,193		8.5%
1980	39,614		3.7%
1990	40,872		3.2%
2000	39,078		−4.4%
2010	39,262		0.5%
2020	40,505		3.2%
U.S. Decennial Census

=== Racial and ethnic composition ===
Essex CDP, Maryland – Racial and ethnic composition Note: the US Census treats Hispanic/Latino as an ethnic category. This table excludes Latinos from the racial categories and assigns them to a separate category. Hispanics/Latinos may be of any race.
Race / Ethnicity (NH = Non-Hispanic)	Pop 2000	Pop 2010	Pop 2020	% 2000	% 2010	% 2020
White alone (NH)	28,734	25,161	21,129	73.53%	64.08%	52.16%
Black or African American alone (NH)	8,106	10,187	12,613	20.74%	25.95%	31.14%
Native American or Alaska Native alone (NH)	201	157	195	0.51%	0.40%	0.48%
Asian alone (NH)	457	702	852	1.17%	1.79%	2.10%
Native Hawaiian or Pacific Islander alone (NH)	14	9	14	0.04%	0.02%	0.03%
Other race alone (NH)	60	85	270	0.15%	0.22%	0.67%
Mixed race or Multiracial (NH)	622	943	2,187	1.59%	2.40%	5.40%
Hispanic or Latino (any race)	884	2,018	3,245	2.26%	5.14%	8.01%
Total	39,078	39,262	40,505	100.00%	100.00%	100.00%

=== 2020 census ===
As of the 2020 census, Essex had a population of 40,505. The median age was 38.3 years. 22.6% of residents were under the age of 18 and 16.4% of residents were 65 years of age or older. For every 100 females there were 90.3 males, and for every 100 females age 18 and over there were 87.5 males age 18 and over.

100.0% of residents lived in urban areas, while 0.0% lived in rural areas.

There were 16,138 households in Essex, of which 30.3% had children under the age of 18 living in them. Of all households, 34.6% were married-couple households, 21.7% were households with a male householder and no spouse or partner present, and 34.5% were households with a female householder and no spouse or partner present. About 31.2% of all households were made up of individuals and 12.6% had someone living alone who was 65 years of age or older.

There were 17,245 housing units, of which 6.4% were vacant. The homeowner vacancy rate was 1.7% and the rental vacancy rate was 6.3%.

Racial composition as of the 2020 census
Race	Number	Percent
White	21,564	53.2%
Black or African American	12,812	31.6%
American Indian and Alaska Native	275	0.7%
Asian	871	2.2%
Native Hawaiian and Other Pacific Islander	16	0.0%
Some other race	2,046	5.1%
Two or more races	2,921	7.2%
Hispanic or Latino (of any race)	3,245	8.0%

=== 2000 census ===
As of the census of 2000, there were 39,078 people, 15,952 households, and 10,336 families residing in the CDP. The population density was 4,104.1 inhabitants per square mile (1,584.6/km^{2}). There were 16,997 housing units at an average density of 1,785.1 units per square mile (689.2 units/km^{2}). The racial makeup of the CDP was 74.56% White, 20.98% African American, 0.55% Native American, 1.17% Asian, 0.05% Pacific Islander, 0.82% from other races, and 1.87% from two or more races. Hispanic or Latino of any race were 2.26% of the population.

There were 15,952 households, out of which 31.8% had children under the age of 18 living with them, 40.8% were married couples living together, 18.2% had a female householder with no husband present, and 35.2% were non-families. 29.3% of all households were made up of individuals, and 10.4% had someone living alone who was 65 years of age or older. The average household size was 2.45 and the average family size was 3.00.

In the CDP, the population was spread out, with 26.1% under the age of 18, 8.9% from 18 to 24, 30.5% from 25 to 44, 21.7% from 45 to 64, and 12.8% who were 65 years of age or older. The median age was 36 years. For every 100 females, there were 93.1 males. For every 100 females age 18 and over, there were 88.3 males.

The median income for a household in the CDP was $34,978, and the median income for a family was $42,177. Males had a median income of $34,105 versus $26,215 for females. The per capita income for the CDP was $17,550. About 10.0% of families and 12.2% of the population were below the poverty line, including 16.2% of those under age 18 and 11.0% of those age 65 or over.

== Schools in Essex, Maryland ==
- Mars Estates Elementary School
- Essex Elementary School
- Sandalwood Elementary School
- Middleborough Elementary School
- Middlesex Elementary School
- Sussex Elementary School
- Stemmers Run Middle School
- Deep Creek Middle School
- Kenwood High School
- Chesapeake High School
- Eastern Technical High School
- Our Lady of Mount Carmel School
- St. Stephens Academy

== Notable person ==
- Lamar King, former NFL defensive end
- Ego Nwodim, former cast member on Saturday Night Live
