= Baltimore County Public Schools =

School district in Maryland, USA

Address
- 6901 North Charles Street Towson, Maryland, 21204; United States

District information
- Type: Public
- Grades: PreK–12
- Superintendent: William Heiser
- NCES District ID: 2400120

Students and staff
- Students: 111,084
- Teachers: 7,821.41
- Staff: 7,517.07
- Student–teacher ratio: 14.2

Other information
- Website: bcps.org

Baltimore County Public Schools is the school district in charge of all public schools in Baltimore County, Maryland, United States. It is the 25th largest school system in the US as of 2013. The school system is managed by the board of education, headquartered in Towson. Since July 1, 2026, the superintendent is William Heiser.

== Schools ==
All areas in Baltimore County are unincorporated; as there are no incorporated cities in Baltimore County, all place names are neighborhoods, and have no legal jurisdiction over their areas. There are currently 106 elementary schools, 30 middle schools, and 25 high schools in the district. A number of these are magnet schools that students from any part of Baltimore County can apply to attend. In addition, there is one charter school and several specialty schools.

In the mid-1980s, Baltimore County shifted the grades in the intermediate-level schools. Until this time, the schools were called "junior high schools" and had grades 7–9. The 9th grade was moved into the high school and the 6th grade was moved in from nearby elementary schools, creating the current "middle school" model with grades 6–8.

== Demographics ==
BCPS has a $1.76 billion budget as per 2016, with a total enrollment of 111,127 students.

As of the 2025-2026 school year, the district’s minority enrollment is 70%. The student body at the schools served by Baltimore County Public Schools is 30.3% white, 39.9% Black, 7.2% Asian or Asian/Pacific Islander, 16.7% Hispanic/Latino, 0.4% American Indian or Alaska Native, and 0.1% Native Hawaiian or other Pacific Islander. In addition, 5.4% of students are two or more races, and 0% have not specified their race or ethnicity.

== Awards and recognition ==
In 2014, Sean McComb of Patapsco High School was named National Teacher of the Year. Superintendent S. Dallas Dance was appointed to the President's Advisory Commission on Educational Excellence for African Americans in August 2014.

The school system was accepted into the prestigious 32-member League of Innovative Schools in February 2013. BCPS is the only school system in Maryland to be designated as ISO 9001 international certification for management.

== Leadership ==
The school district is led by superintendent Dr. William Heiser and his cabinet, consisting of a chief of staff as well as academic, communications, administrative operations, and human resource officers.

== Notable events ==
On November 24, 2020, the school system's computer network suffered a ransomware attack suspected to be due to Ryuk malware. County school officials characterized it as "a catastrophic attack on our technology system" and said it could be weeks before recovery is complete. The school system's director of information technology said, "This is a ransomware attack which encrypts data as it sits and does not access or remove it from our system". Prior to the crippling malware attack, state auditors from the Maryland Office of Legislative Audits performed a periodic audit of the Baltimore County School System's computer network in 2019. They found several vulnerabilities in the system, such as insufficient monitoring of security activities, publicly accessible servers not isolated from the school system's internal network, and a lack of "intrusion detection ... for untrusted traffic". Avi Rubin, Technical Director of the Information Security Institute at Johns Hopkins University, said the auditors' discovery of "computers that were running on the internal network with no intrusion detection capabilities" was of particular concern. Although the final report by the Maryland Office of Legislative Audits was released on November 19, 2020, the auditors initially warned the school system of its findings in October 2019.

In March of 2018, former Superintendent Dallas Dance pleaded guilty to four counts of perjury. "Dance admit[ted] he did not disclose nearly $147,000 he earned from consulting jobs while he was running the county schools. Those payments include money he received from a company he helped win a contract from the county. State prosecutor Emmet Davitt said it’s clear Dance did not report the money deliberately, even creating a document that claimed he was donating some of the money he admitted receiving to the Baltimore County Education Fund. 'That was a false document,' Davitt said. 'No money went to the Baltimore County Education Fund. It all went to him.'"

== Students and Teachers Accessing Tomorrow (S.T.A.T.) ==
To create 21st century learning environments that allow for student-centered learning experiences within the school system's "Framework for Teaching and Learning", Baltimore County Public Schools has established Students and Teachers Accessing Tomorrow (S.T.A.T.). S.T.A.T. is aligned with the school system's "Theory of Action", part of which is to "ensure that every school has an equitable, effective digital learning environment". The work that supports S.T.A.T.'s goals includes the district's conversions of curriculum, instruction, assessment, organizational development, infrastructure, communications, policy, and budget.

== Capacity issues ==
In 1978, due to a dip in enrollment projections, the elimination of six elementary schools and the repurposing of two middle schools was proposed by the board. This was eventually implemented by then superintendent Robert Y. Dubel, despite significant public objection. At the January 11, 1978 board meeting, Dundalk, Gray Manor, Inverness, Lutherville, Parkville, and Towson elementary schools were proposed to be closed; Eastwood and Ruxton elementary schools were proposed to be repurposed as special education facilities; and Towsontown Junior was proposed to be repurposed as Central Vocational-Technical Center.

Overcrowding in some elementary schools due to population growth became an issue in 2007, particularly at four elementary schools in the Towson area — Hampton, Riderwood, Rodgers Forge, and Stoneleigh — which were said to have 451 over their 1,665-pupil capacity. In December 2007, a parents' advocacy group, Towson Families United, called for construction of a new elementary school to alleviate overcrowding, with the group threatening a demonstration near the courthouse office of Baltimore County Executive James T. Smith Jr. On May 6, 2008, the school board announced that a new school would open in 2010 near the existing Ridge Ruxton School on Charles Street.

Overcrowding continues to plague the BCPS school system. In 2018 it was particularly bad in the North East area of the school system, where there was a deficit of over 1,700 seats on the elementary level. Perry Hall Middle school was on track to be the largest school in the county, with more than 400 students beyond maximum capacity.

== List of schools ==
=== Elementary schools ===
There are currently 108 elementary schools:

- Arbutus Elementary School
- Baltimore Highlands Elementary School
- Battle Grove Elementary School
- Bear Creek Elementary School
- Bedford Elementary School
- Berkshire Elementary School
- Carney Elementary School
- Carroll Manor Elementary School
- Catonsville Elementary School
- Cedarmere Elementary School
- Chadwick Elementary School
- Chapel Hill Elementary School
- Charlesmont Elementary School
- Chase Elementary School
- Chatsworth School
- Chesapeake Terrace Elementary School
- Church Lane Elementary Technology
- Colgate Elementary School
- Cromwell Valley Elementary Magnet School
- Deep Creek Elementary School
- Deer Park Elementary School
- Dogwood Elementary School
- Dundalk Elementary School
- Edgemere Elementary School
- Edmondson Heights Elementary School
- Elmwood Elementary School
- Essex Elementary School
- Featherbed Lane Elementary School
- Fifth District Elementary School
- Fort Garrison Elementary School
- Franklin Elementary School
- Fullerton Elementary School
- Glenmar Elementary School
- Glyndon Elementary School
- Grange Elementary School
- Halethorpe Elementary School
- Halstead Academy
- Hampton Elementary School
- Harford Hills Elementary School
- Hawthorne Elementary School
- Hebbville Elementary School
- Hernwood Elementary School
- Hillcrest Elementary School
- Honeygo Elementary School
- Jacksonville Elementary School
- Johnnycake Elementary School
- Joppa View Elementary School
- Kingsville Elementary School
- Lansdowne Elementary School
- Logan Elementary School
- Lutherville Laboratory
- Lyons Mill Elementary School
- Mars Estates Elementary School
- Martin Boulevard Elementary School
- Mays Chapel Elementary School
- McCormick Elementary School
- Middleborough Elementary School
- Middlesex Elementary School
- Milbrook Elementary School
- New Town Elementary School
- Norwood Elementary School
- Oakleigh Elementary School
- Oliver Beach Elementary School
- Orems Elementary School
- Owings Mills Elementary School
- Padonia International Elementary School
- Perry Hall Elementary School
- Pine Grove Elementary School
- Pinewood Elementary School
- Pleasant Plains Elementary School
- Pot Spring Elementary School
- Powhatan Elementary School
- Prettyboy Elementary School
- Randallstown Elementary School
- Red House Run Elementary School
- Reisterstown Elementary School
- Relay Elementary School
- Riderwood Elementary School
- Riverview Elementary School
- Rodgers Forge Elementary School
- Rossville Elementary School
- Sandalwood Elementary School
- Sandy Plains Elementary School
- Scotts Branch Elementary School
- Seneca Elementary School
- Seven Oaks Elementary School
- Seventh District Elementary School
- Shady Spring Elementary School
- Sparks Elementary School
- Stoneleigh Elementary School
- Summit Park Elementary School
- Sussex Elementary School
- Timber Grove Elementary School
- Timonium Elementary School
- Victory Villa Elementary School
- Villa Cresta Elementary School
- Vincent Farm Elementary School
- Warren Elementary School
- Wellwood International School
- Westchester Elementary School
- Westowne Elementary School
- West Towson Elementary School
- Winand Elementary School
- Winfield Elementary School
- Woodbridge Elementary School
- Woodholme Elementary School
- Woodmoor Elementary School

=== Middle schools ===
There are currently 30 middle schools:

- Arbutus Middle School
- Bridge Center
- Catonsville Middle School
- Cockeysville Middle School
- Deep Creek Magnet Middle School
- Deer Park Middle Magnet School
- Dumbarton Middle School
- Dundalk Middle School
- General John Stricker Middle School
- Franklin Middle School
- Hereford Middle School
- Holabird Middle School
- Lansdowne Middle School
- Loch Raven Technical Academy
- Meadowwood Education Center
- Middle River Middle School
- Nottingham Middle School
- Northwest Academy of Health Sciences
- Parkville Middle and Center of Technology
- Perry Hall Middle School
- Pikesville Middle School
- Pine Grove Middle School
- Ridgely Middle School
- Southwest Academy
- Sparrows Point Middle School
- Stemmers Run Middle School
- Sudbrook Magnet Middle School
- Windsor Mill Middle School
- Woodlawn Middle School

=== High schools ===
There are currently 25 high schools:

- George Washington Carver Center for Arts and Technology
- Catonsville High School
- Chesapeake High School
- Dulaney High School
- Dundalk High School
- Eastern Technical High School
- Franklin High School
- Hereford High School
- Kenwood High School
- Lansdowne High School
- Loch Raven High School
- Milford Mill Academy
- New Town High School
- Overlea High School & Academy of Finance
- Owings Mills High School
- Parkville High School and Center for Math, Science, and Computer Science
- Patapsco High School and Center for the Arts
- Perry Hall High School
- Pikesville High School
- Randallstown High School
- Sollers Point Technical High School
- Sparrows Point High School
- Towson High School
- Woodlawn High School
- Western School of Technology and Environmental Science

=== Magnet schools ===
These schools can be attended by any Baltimore County student through an application process. Students attend these schools as full-time students.

- Chesapeake High
- Chatsworth School
- Church Lane Elementary
- Cromwell Valley Elementary
- Deep Creek Middle
- Deer Park Magnet Middle
- Eastern Technical
- George Washington Carver Center for Arts and Technology
- Halstead Academy
- Kenwood High
- Lansdowne High
- Lansdowne Middle
- Loch Raven technical Academy
- Lutherville Laboratory
- Milford Mill Academy
- Overlea High
- Parkville High
- Parkville Middle
- Patapsco High
- Randallstown High
- Sollers Point Technical High
- Southwest Academy
- Sparrows Point High
- Stemmers Run Middle
- Sudbrook Magnet Middle
- Towson High
- Wellwood International
- Western School of Technology
- Windsor Mill Middle
- Woodlawn High

=== Charter schools ===
- Watershed Public Charter School

=== Specialty schools ===
- Battle Monument
- Bridge Center
- Campfield Early Childhood Center
- Catonsville Center for Alternative Studies
- Hannah More School
- Maiden Choice School
- R.I.C.A. Catonsville Education Center
- Ridge Ruxton School
- Rosedale Center
- White Oak School

== High school AP statistics ==
High school Advanced Placement scores 2015

High school	High school enrollment	AP exams	AP exams 3+	AP exams 3+ %
Catonsville	1758	799	568	71.1%
Chesapeake	991	193	59	30.6%
Dulaney	1803	1791	1493	83.4%
Dundalk	1435	151	30	19.9%
Eastern Technology	1106	770	581	75.5%
Carver	853	511	410	80.2%
Hereford	1188	880	657	74.7%
Kenwood	1629	268	69	25.7%
Lansdowne	1234	172	52	30.2%
Loch Raven	884	454	269	59.3%
Milford Mill	1519	286	45	15.7%
New Town	997	124	62	50.0%
Overlea	963	122	33	27.0%
Owings Mills	932	250	93	37.2%
Parkville	1596	315	156	49.5%
Patapsco	1434	298	111	37.2%
Perry Hall	2105	964	609	63.2%
Pikesville	840	492	336	68.3%
Randallstown	1021	180	54	30.0%
Sparrows Point	860	135	58	43.0%
Towson	1444	1303	1031	79.1%
Western	926	515	418	81.2%
Woodlawn	1385	76	15	19.7%
