= David Jackson (American football) =

American football player (born 1965)

No. 84
- Position: Wide receiver

Personal information
- Born: January 2, 1965 (age 61); Baltimore, Maryland, U.S.
- Listed height: 5 ft 8 in (1.73 m)
- Listed weight: 175 lb (79 kg)

Career information
- High school: Perry Hall (Perry Hall, Maryland)
- College: Southeast Missouri State
- NFL draft: 1987: undrafted

Career history
- Tampa Bay Buccaneers (1987); Cleveland Browns (1988)*; New York Jets (1989)*
- * Offseason or practice squad member only

Career NFL statistics
- Games played: 1
- Stats at Pro Football Reference

David Leonard Jackson (born January 2, 1965) is an American former professional football player who was a wide receiver for one game with the Tampa Bay Buccaneers of the National Football League (NFL). He played college football for the Southeast Missouri State Redhawks.

From Bradshaw, Maryland, he played college football and ran track at Southeast Missouri State University, where he was one of the top sprinters in the NCAA Division II ranks. He signed with the Tampa Bay Buccaneers as an undrafted free agent in 1987 and, after initially not making the final roster, was re-signed as a replacement player during the NFL strike and appeared in one game. He later had stints with the Cleveland Browns in 1988 and with the New York Jets in 1989.
