= Parkville, Maryland =

- Census-designated place
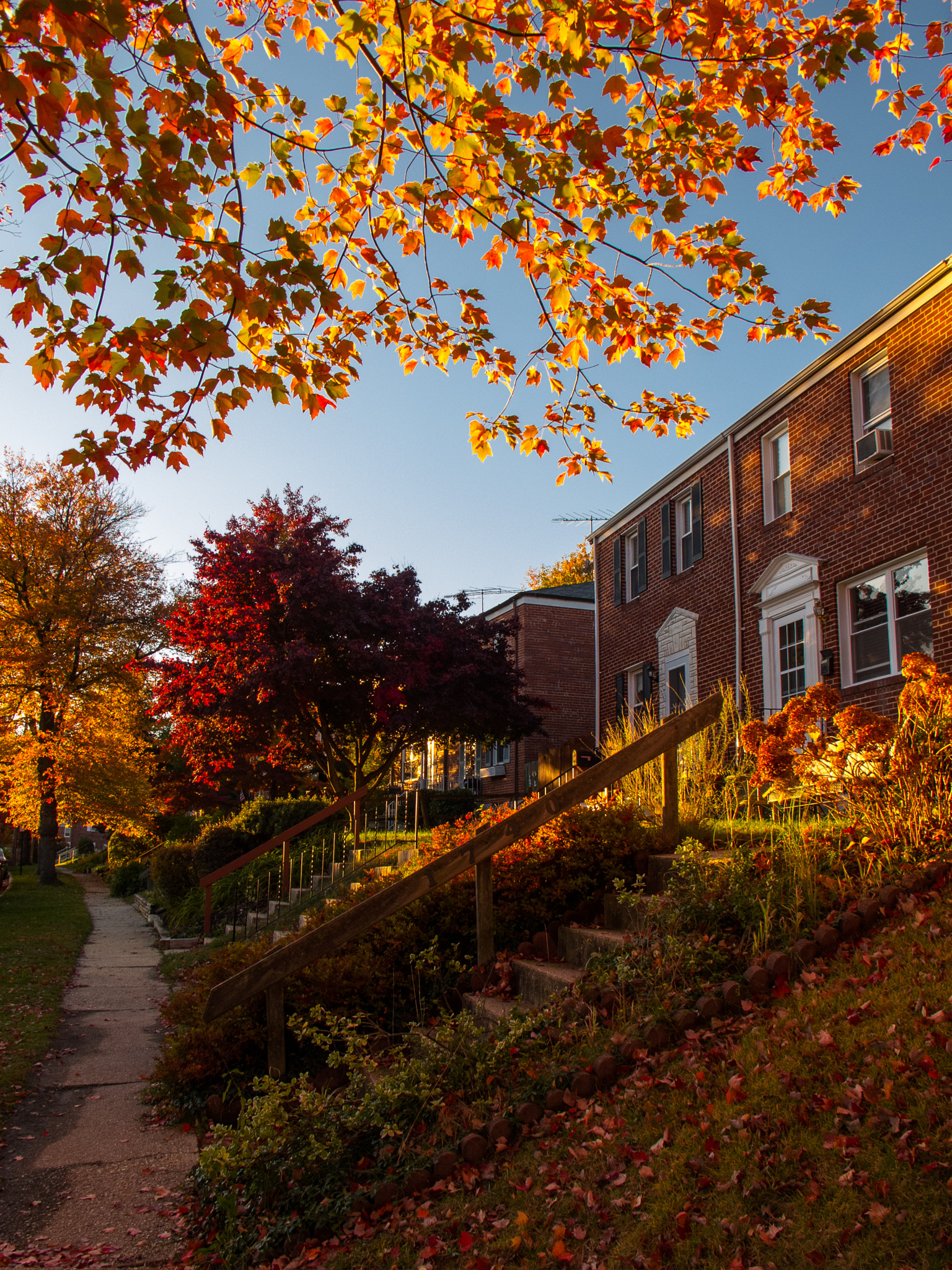
- Townhomes on a residential street in the Ridgeleigh area of Parkville, Maryland

- Location of Parkville, Maryland
- Coordinates: 39°22′59″N 76°33′0″W
- Country: United States
- State: Maryland
- County: Baltimore

Area
  - Total: 4.29 sq mi (11.10 km^{2})
  - Land: 4.29 sq mi (11.10 km^{2})
  - Water: 0 sq mi (0.00 km^{2})
- Elevation: 331 ft (101 m)

Population (2020)
  - Total: 31,812
  - Density: 7,424.4/sq mi (2,866.58/km^{2})
- Time zone: UTC−5 (Eastern (EST))
  - Summer (DST): UTC−4 (EDT)
- ZIP code: 21234
- Area code: 410
- FIPS code: 24-60275
- GNIS feature ID: 0590976

Parkville is an unincorporated community and census-designated place in Baltimore County, Maryland, United States. As of the 2010 census, the population was 30,734.

== Geography ==
According to the United States Census Bureau, the CDP has a total area of 4.2 square miles (11 km^{2}). The northern border of the CDP is Interstate 695 (the Baltimore Beltway) from Loch Raven Boulevard to Putty Hill Avenue. The eastern border is roughly where Putty Hill Avenue becomes Rossville Boulevard, the southern border is the Baltimore City/Baltimore County line from near Glen Road to Loch Raven Boulevard, and the western boundary is Loch Raven Boulevard from the city line to I-695.

== Demographics ==
Historical population
Census	Pop.	Note	%±
1960	27,236		—
1970	33,589		23.3%
1980	35,159		4.7%
1990	31,617		−10.1%
2000	31,118		−1.6%
2010	30,734		−1.2%
2020	31,812		3.5%
U.S. Decennial Census

=== Racial and ethnic composition ===
Parkville CDP, Maryland – Racial and ethnic composition Note: the US Census treats Hispanic/Latino as an ethnic category. This table excludes Latinos from the racial categories and assigns them to a separate category. Hispanics/Latinos may be of any race.
Race / Ethnicity (NH = Non-Hispanic)	Pop 2000	Pop 2010	Pop 2020	% 2000	% 2010	% 2020
White alone (NH)	22,630	18,486	14,722	72.72%	60.15%	46.28%
Black or African American alone (NH)	6,938	9,459	11,937	22.30%	30.78%	37.52%
Native American or Alaska Native alone (NH)	50	66	80	0.16%	0.21%	0.25%
Asian alone (NH)	582	865	1,167	1.87%	2.81%	3.67%
Native Hawaiian or Pacific Islander alone (NH)	3	12	11	0.01%	0.04%	0.03%
Other race alone (NH)	28	37	203	0.09%	0.12%	0.64%
Mixed race or Multiracial (NH)	372	651	1,340	1.20%	2.12%	4.21%
Hispanic or Latino (any race)	515	1,158	2,352	1.65%	3.77%	7.39%
Total	31,118	30,734	31,812	100.00%	100.00%	100.00%

=== 2020 census ===
As of the 2020 census, Parkville had a population of 31,812. The median age was 36.9 years. 22.0% of residents were under the age of 18 and 14.2% of residents were 65 years of age or older. For every 100 females there were 87.7 males, and for every 100 females age 18 and over there were 83.7 males age 18 and over.

100.0% of residents lived in urban areas, while 0.0% lived in rural areas.

There were 12,820 households in Parkville, of which 30.4% had children under the age of 18 living in them. Of all households, 34.3% were married-couple households, 20.6% were households with a male householder and no spouse or partner present, and 37.2% were households with a female householder and no spouse or partner present. About 29.8% of all households were made up of individuals and 10.8% had someone living alone who was 65 years of age or older.

There were 13,619 housing units, of which 5.9% were vacant. The homeowner vacancy rate was 1.4% and the rental vacancy rate was 7.3%.

Racial composition as of the 2020 census
Race	Number	Percent
White	15,068	47.4%
Black or African American	12,101	38.0%
American Indian and Alaska Native	130	0.4%
Asian	1,170	3.7%
Native Hawaiian and Other Pacific Islander	12	0.0%
Some other race	1,286	4.0%
Two or more races	2,045	6.4%
Hispanic or Latino (of any race)	2,352	7.4%

=== 2000 census ===
At the 2000 census there were 31,118 people, 13,044 households, and 8,243 families living in the CDP. The population density was 7,352.1 inhabitants per square mile (2,838.7/km^{2}). There were 13,550 housing units at an average density of 3,201.4 per square mile (1,236.1/km^{2}). The racial makeup of the CDP was 73.64% White, 22.48% African American, 0.16% Native American, 1.88% Asian, 0.02% Pacific Islander, 0.42% from other races, and 1.39% from two or more races. Hispanic or Latino of any race were 1.65%.

Of the 13,044 households 28.3% had children under the age of 18 living with them, 42.8% were married couples living together, 16.2% had a female householder with no husband present, and 36.8% were non-families. 29.8% of households were one person and 11.1% were one person aged 65 or older. The average household size was 2.36 and the average family size was 2.93.

The age distribution was 22.8% under the age of 18, 8.9% from 18 to 24, 30.4% from 25 to 44, 20.8% from 45 to 64, and 17.1% 65 or older. The median age was 38 years. For every 100 females, there were 86.1 males. For every 100 females age 18 and over, there were 81.5 males.

The median income for a household in the CDP was $41,410, and the median family income was $50,421. Males had a median income of $36,728 versus $27,579 for females. The per capita income for the CDP was $20,633. About 6.4% of families and 7.4% of the population were below the poverty line, including 8.9% of those under age 18 and 5.7% of those age 65 or over.

== Education ==
People in Parkville are zoned for the following schools:

=== Elementary schools ===
- Halstead Academy
- Oakleigh Elementary
- Villa Cresta Elementary
- Harford Hills Elementary
- Elmwood Elementary
- Pleasant Plains Elementary (in Towson)

=== Middle schools ===
- Parkville Middle and Center of Technology
- Pine Grove Middle School
- Loch Raven Technical Academy (in Towson)

=== Elementary/middle schools ===
- Woodhome Elementary/Middle School

=== High schools ===
- Parkville High School
- Loch Raven High School (in Towson)

== Transportation ==
=== Roads ===
Some of the major roads in the Parkville area are:

- Harford Road (MD-147)
- Joppa Road
- Old Harford Road
- Perring Parkway
- Putty Hill Avenue
- Taylor Avenue

=== Public transportation ===
The Maryland Transit Administration's Bus Route 54 operates along Harford Road between the Carney Park-and-Ride and Downtown Baltimore.

== Local culture ==
An annual Czech and Slovak Heritage Festival is held in Parkville to celebrate the Czech and Slovak heritage of Baltimore.

For several years, Parkville was the primary location for the music festival Stanstock, a nonprofit charity that primarily benefits two local charities, the Nicole Van Horn Foundation and the Catch a Lift Fund.
