= Sparrows Point High School =

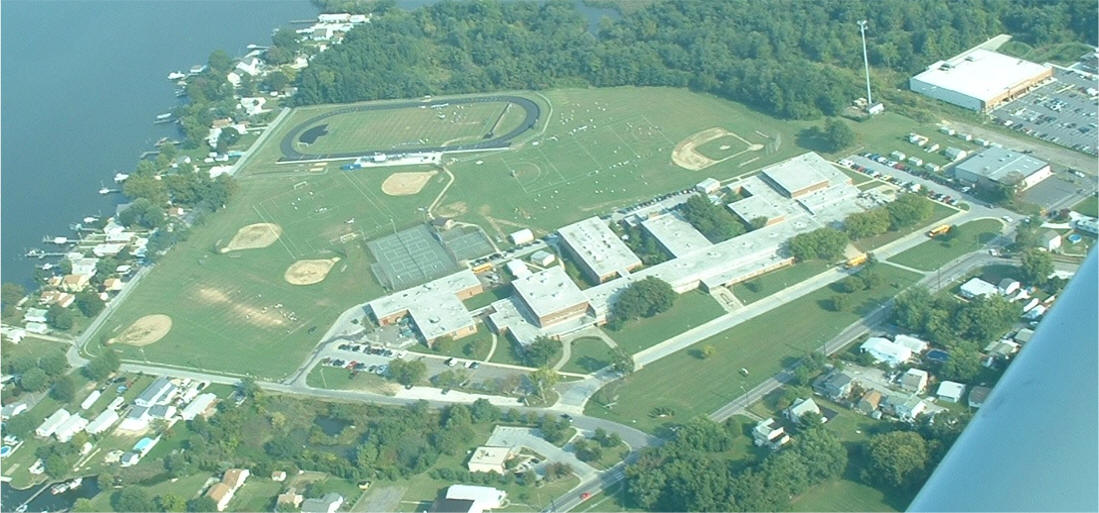
- Aerial view of Sparrows Point High School

Location
- 7400 North Point Road; Sparrows Point, Maryland; United States; 39°14′18″N 76°26′32″W

Information
- Type: Public high school
- Motto: "Great Expectations and Wonders" "The East Side Dream Team"
- Established: 1908; 118 years ago
- School district: Baltimore County Public Schools
- NCES School ID: 240012000477
- Principal: Larissa Santos
- Teaching staff: 69.67 FTE (2022-23)
- Grades: 9–12
- Gender: Co-educational
- Enrollment: 1,146 (2022-23)
- Student to teacher ratio: 16.45 (2022-23)
- Colors: Blue and gray
- Mascot: Steel The Pointer
- Website: sparrowspoinths.bcps.org

Sparrows Point High is a public high school located in Sparrows Point, Maryland. It is one of 24 high schools in the Baltimore County Public Schools system. The school was established in 1908 and is located on a 35-acre (140,000 m^{2}) campus in the southeastern corner of Baltimore County on a peninsula, which juts out into the Chesapeake Bay.

Sparrows Point High is fully accredited by the Middle States Association of Colleges and Secondary Schools and by the Maryland State Department of Education. The school's colors are blue and gray and the mascot is the "Pointer".

== Academics ==
Sparrows Point High School received a 60.7 out of a possible 90 points (67%) on the 2018-2019 Maryland State Department of Education Report Card and received a 4 out of 5 star rating, ranking in the 65th percentile among all Maryland schools.

== Special programs ==
=== S.P.E.C.I.E.S. ===
SPECIES, (Sparrows Point Educational Center in Environmental Studies) is a magnet program for students with particularly intense interest in science. Magnet students are recruited throughout the eastern half of Baltimore County. The program provides in-depth experiences in a wide variety of aquatic and environmentally related sciences. Courses offering college credit are part of the SPECIES Program.

=== College credit ===
College credit is earned every year by students who take the Advanced Placement exams. Additionally, juniors and seniors may attend classes for half of each day at The Community College of Baltimore County. Students in this program may earn as many as fifteen college credits before they graduate from high school.

=== Sollers Point Technical High ===
Approximately 20 percent of the students attend Sollers Point Technical High School for half of each school day to gain technical skills. Various other vocational programs are available, several of which culminate in cooperative work-study experience.

=== Special needs ===
A Maryland's Tomorrow program is available for at-risk students and a special education program is offered for learning-disabled students.

== Extracurricular programs ==
Many programs exist for Sparrows Point students beyond the regular curriculum. A complete interscholastic athletic program is offered that includes fall, winter, and spring sports. Students publish a literary magazine, newspaper, and yearbook. Chapters of the National Honor Society, the National Art Honor Society, the National Science Honor Society, and the National Music Honor Society are all active at Sparrows Point, as are Future Business Leaders of America, Future Educators of America, and Students Against Destructive Decisions (SADD). The Student Government gives students opportunities to gain leadership experience. Instrumental and vocal music ensembles are also available. FUSION, an independent Christian-based after school program, has had a presence at Sparrows Point since 2009.

== Athletics ==
=== State championships ===
Boys Cross Country:

- Class B 1973

Girls Soccer

- 1A 2013, 2014, 2015, 2016, 2017, 2018 2A 2023

Boys Soccer

- Class B 1973, 1974, 1975
  - 1A 2006 (TIE), 2017
- Pre-MPSSAA:
  - Combined Class 1920, 1927
  - Class A 1946

Boys Basketball

- Class A 1961

Baseball

- Class B 1979

Tennis

- 1A 2019

== Notable alumni ==
- William T. Evans (Class of 1943), member of the Maryland House of Delegates and judge
- Roger B. Hayden (Class of 1962) - Hall of Fame (inducted 2016) - County Executive of Baltimore County, Maryland (1990–1994)
- Johnny Olszewski (Class of 2000) - Hall of Fame (inducted 2016) - U.S. Representative from Maryland's 2nd congressional district (2025–), Baltimore County Executive (2018–2025), member of the Maryland House of Delegates (2006–2015)
- Ron Swoboda (Class of 1962) - Hall of Fame (inducted 2014) - Outfielder for the New York Mets; was the "star" in the 1969 World Series defeat of the Orioles
- Johnny Ray Salling (Class of 1980), politician

== Principals ==
- Joseph Blair (1908–1931)
- Benjamin Willis (1931–1932)
- Austin Wheeler (1932–1940)
- William Sartorius (1940–1942)
- Taylor Johnston (1942–1947)
- William Jones (1947–1948)
- Nelson Hurley (1948–1956)
- Paul Dowling (1956–1963)
- Howard Ritter (1963–1967)
- Anthony Marchione (1967–1970)
- Wayne Burgemeister (1970–1977)
- Dr. Michael Eder (1977–1984)
- Nicholas Spinnato (1984–1990)
- Keith Harmeyer (1991–1994)
- Dr. Margaret Spicer (1994–1998)
- Harold Hatton (1998–1999)
- Wayne Thibeault (1999–2001)
- Robert SantaCroce (2002–2012)
- Samuel Wynkoop (2012-2015)
- Emily Caster (2015–2025)
- Larissa Santos (2025–Present)
