= Loch Raven High School =

Location
- 1212 Cowpens Avenue; Towson, Maryland; United States; 39.40494°N 76.56379°W

Information
- Type: Public Secondary
- Established: 1972
- School district: Baltimore County Public Schools
- Principal: Janine G. Holmes
- Faculty: 56
- Grades: 9–12
- Enrollment: 855
- Campus: Suburban
- Colors: Purple and Gold
- Mascot: Raiders
- Newspaper: The Revelation
- Website: https://lochravenhs.bcps.org/
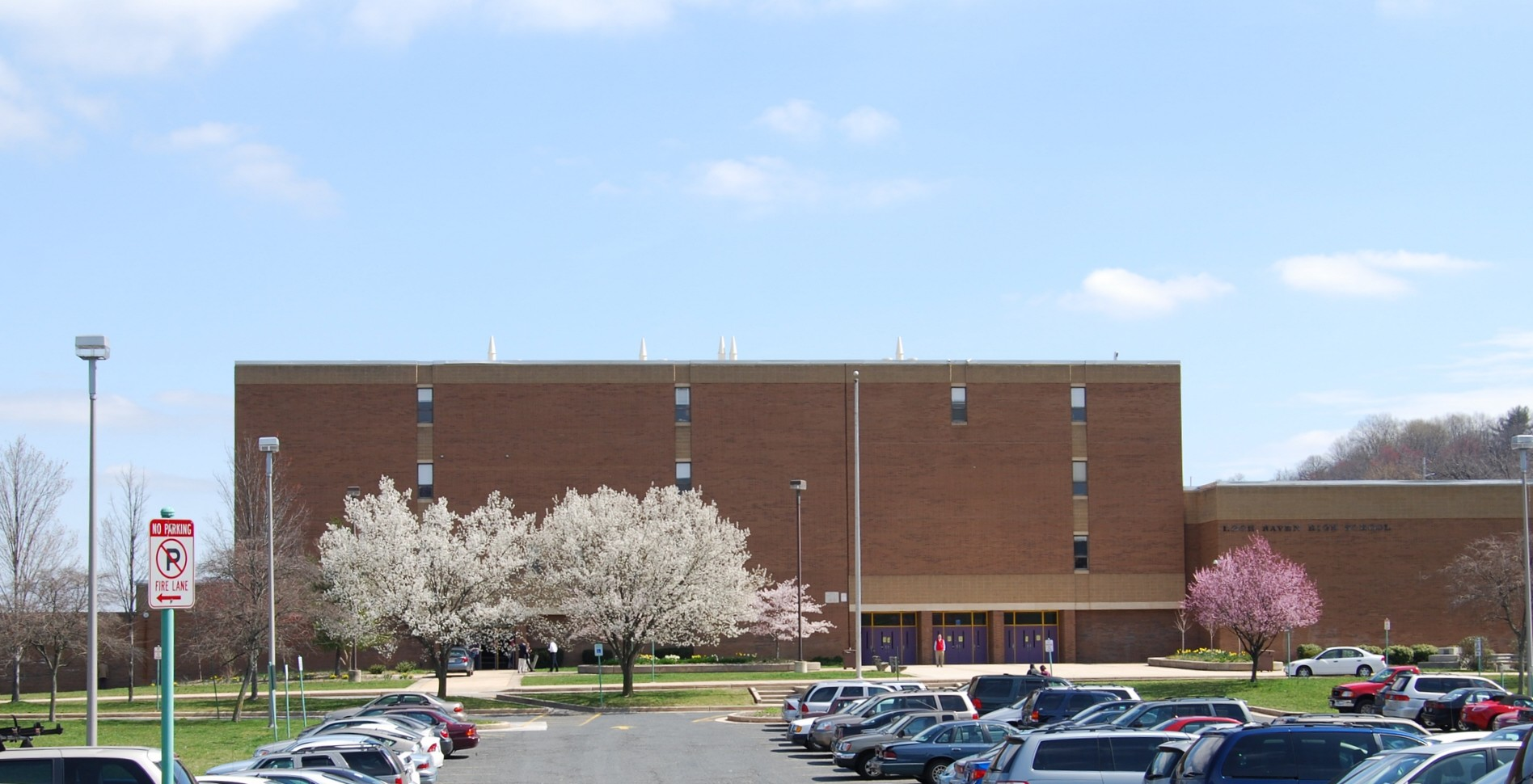
- Loch Raven High School

Loch Raven High School is a high school in Baltimore County, Maryland, United States.

== History ==
The school was established in 1972 and is part of the Baltimore County Public School System. Some of the middle schools whose graduates then enter Loch Raven High are Pine Grove Middle School, Ridgely Middle School, Loch Raven Technical Academy, and Cockeysville Middle School.

Neighborhoods that feed into Loch Raven High School include:

- Parkville, Maryland
- Carney, Maryland
- Towson, Maryland
- Loch Raven, Maryland
- Glen Arm, Maryland
- Baldwin, Maryland
- Hydes, Maryland
- Hampton, Maryland

== Academics ==
Loch Raven High school received a 55.2 out of a possible 90 points (61%) on the 2018-2019 Maryland State Department of Education Report Card and received a 4 out of 5 star rating, ranking in the 51st percentile among all Maryland schools.

Loch Raven High School offers the following AP Courses:

- AP Biology
- AP Calculus AB
- AP Calculus BC
- AP Chemistry
- AP Computer Science A
- AP English Language and Composition
- AP English Literature and Composition
- AP Environmental Science
- AP French Language
- AP U.S. Government and Politics
- AP Human Geography
- AP Macroeconomics
- AP Microeconomics
- AP Music Theory
- AP Physics 1
- AP Physics 2
- AP Physics C: Electricity and Magnetism
- AP Physics C: Mechanics
- AP Psychology
- AP Spanish Language
- AP Statistics
- AP Studio Art Drawing
- AP US History
- AP World History

== Students ==
The 2023–2024 enrollment at Loch Raven High School was 855 students. The racial makeup at the school is 54.2% Black, 28.8% White, 7.8% Hispanic, 4% Asian, and 4.7% two or more races.

== Athletics ==
=== State championships ===
Girls Cross Country

- 1A 2004

Boys Cross Country

- Class A 1976, 1981, 1983
- 2A 1990
- 1A 2002

Field Hockey

- Class A 1979, 1987
- 2A 1992

Girls Soccer

- 2A-1A 1993, 1996
- 2A 1999 TIE
- 1A 2001 TIE, 2003, 2009

Boys Soccer

- Class A 1974, 1975, 1977
- 1A 2009

Volleyball

- Class A 1987
- 3A 1988
- 2A 1994

Girls Basketball

- Class A 1976

Girls Lacrosse

- 2A-1A 1990, 1991, 1994, 1995

Boys Lacrosse

- 2A-1A 2006

Boys Track and Field

- 1A 2003

Baseball

- Class AA 1983

== Notable alumni ==
- Pat Downey - professional mixed martial artist, submission grappler and freestyle wrestler
- John Kassir - actor and comedian
- Sean Landeta - former professional football player
- Ana Montes - convicted Cuban spy
- John G. Trueschler - former member of the Maryland House of Delegates
- Janine Tucker - (nee Kormanik) American lacrosse coach, all-time winningest coach at Johns Hopkins University
