= Dan Keplinger =

Artist Dan Keplinger (born 19 January 1973) was featured in the Oscar-winning documentary short, King Gimp. Born with cerebral palsy, he lives in Towson, Maryland, where he continues to paint.

== Education ==
After attending a school for disabled children, he was mainstreamed into Parkville High School in Maryland at age 16. He is a 1998 graduate of Towson University with a major in mass communication.

Keplinger visits schools as a guest motivational speaker.

== The name King Gimp ==
According to The Baltimore Sun, "King Gimp was the name neighbors gave him as a child because his house was on the top of a hill and he liked to roll down it in his wheelchair. A fighting spirit, he calls himself." He explained to a huge audience that "gimp" means fighting spirit to him, when he was featured in a Super Bowl ad for Cingular Wireless in 2001.

== Keplinger's art ==
Through school Keplinger participated in many Art Department shows. In addition, his work was shown all across Maryland sponsored by Very Special Arts. In 1993 he was the Very Special Arts featured artist in their show at the Eubie Blake Cultural Center in Baltimore City. Currently, he is exclusively represented by the Phyllis Kind Gallery in SOHO, New York.

Keplinger had his first solo show in May 2000. He has had work in several shows across the country including 2001-2002 eMotion Picture, An Exhibition of Orthopedics in Art. San Francisco, California Herbst International Exhibition Hall at the San Francisco Presidio, Washington, DC Millennium Arts Center, Chicago, Illinois Chicago Cultural Center, New York, NY United Nations, United Cerebral Palsy Great Expressions art show 2000 and 2001, Towson and MD Sheppard Pratt Conference Center. Keplinger's art features large canvases with bold colors and many are self-portraits.

Keplinger says this about his art:

"At a glance my work seems to be about my perception in society and how I overcome it. I include images of my wheelchair because it is my main mode of conveyance and a major part of my daily life, but these pieces are about much more than my disability. Obstacles and challenges are a universal part of the human condition. We all face them in everyday life, however we also have a choice as to how we deal with them. Many of us are likely to get discouraged during difficult times in our lives. In my work I hope to show everybody that they have the ability to persevere."

"When I start a piece, I just think of what I have to say and not who is going to view it. I know people are not going to view my work as I do, but everyone can get the overall message."

Keplinger has begun working in clay as well.

== Documentaries ==
In 1983 Susan Hadary and William Whiteford featured Keplinger in their documentary "Beginning With Bong" dealing with the education of disabled children.

Later the same filmmakers devoted the documentary King Gimp to Keplinger. King Gimp won the 2000 Academy Award for Best Documentary. The film also won a Peabody award and was nominated for a national Emmy.

In 2004 the same filmmakers produced a sequel to King Gimp entitled The King’s Miracle.

In 2001, Dan was featured in a nationally televised Cingular Wireless Super Bowl commercial, which was ranked as number one by USA Today.
