= Perry Hall High School =

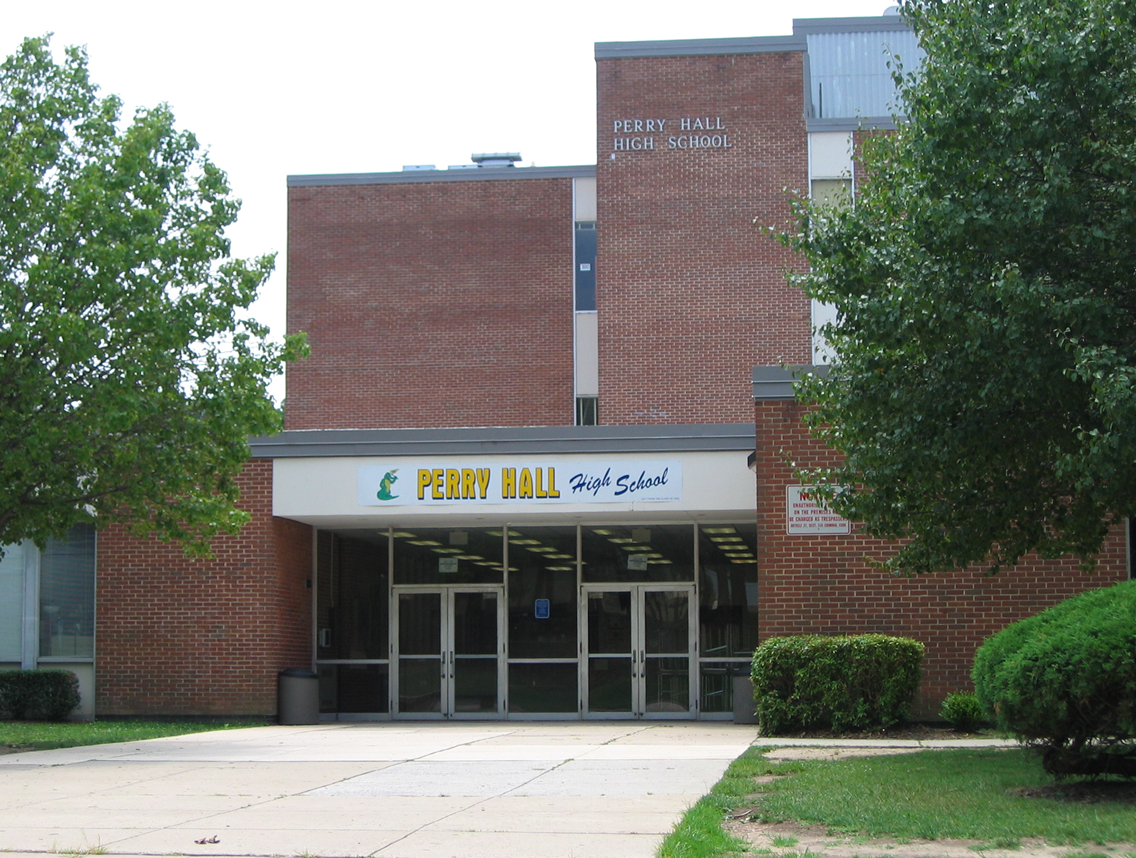
- Main entrance

Location
- 4601 Ebenezer Road; Perry Hall, Maryland 21236; United States; 39°23′38″N 76°27′53″W

Information
- Type: Public Secondary
- Motto: Respect • Responsibility • Integrity • Civility
- Established: 1963
- School district: Baltimore County Public Schools
- Principal: Abbey Campbell
- Grades: 9–12
- Enrollment: 2121 (2014)
- Campus: Suburban
- Colors: Navy, Gold, and White
- Athletics conference: MPSSAA Baltimore County League
- Nickname: Gators
- Accreditation: MSA
- Newspaper: The Hallmark
- Yearbook: Hallways
- Website: Official website

Perry Hall High School (PHHS) is a public high school in Baltimore County, Maryland, United States, established in 1967 enrolling about 2,000 students a year. Located in the northeastern Baltimore suburb of Perry Hall and serving the surrounding communities, such as Kingsville and Glen Arm, it is part of the Baltimore County Public Schools system. Area middle schools that feed into Perry Hall High are Perry Hall Middle School, Middle River Middle School, and Pine Grove Middle School.

== Structure ==
When initially established, Perry Hall High School was located in the building which today is Perry Hall Middle School. The class of 1968 was the first class to graduate from the new and current building located just down the road. In 1973 construction started on a small addition to the front of the building. This first addition was built adjacent to the library. Nine new classrooms were built to accommodate 350 more students and four new teachers. Renovations that took place in the same year included a team locker room, new biology, and chemistry labs, and an addition to the faculty dining room. A three-story new addition had to be built in 1997 to fight overcrowding. The new section has health and career education classrooms below ground level, tall music rooms and social science rooms at ground level, and foreign language and art rooms on the second floor. Because of the tall music rooms, the second floor of the new addition is a half story higher than the second floor of the main building. Currently, there are portable classrooms situated outside the main building to alleviate the continuing overpopulation problem. The most recent addition was a hallway around the auditorium to alleviate the crowded junction on the first floor between the old and new wings.

== History ==
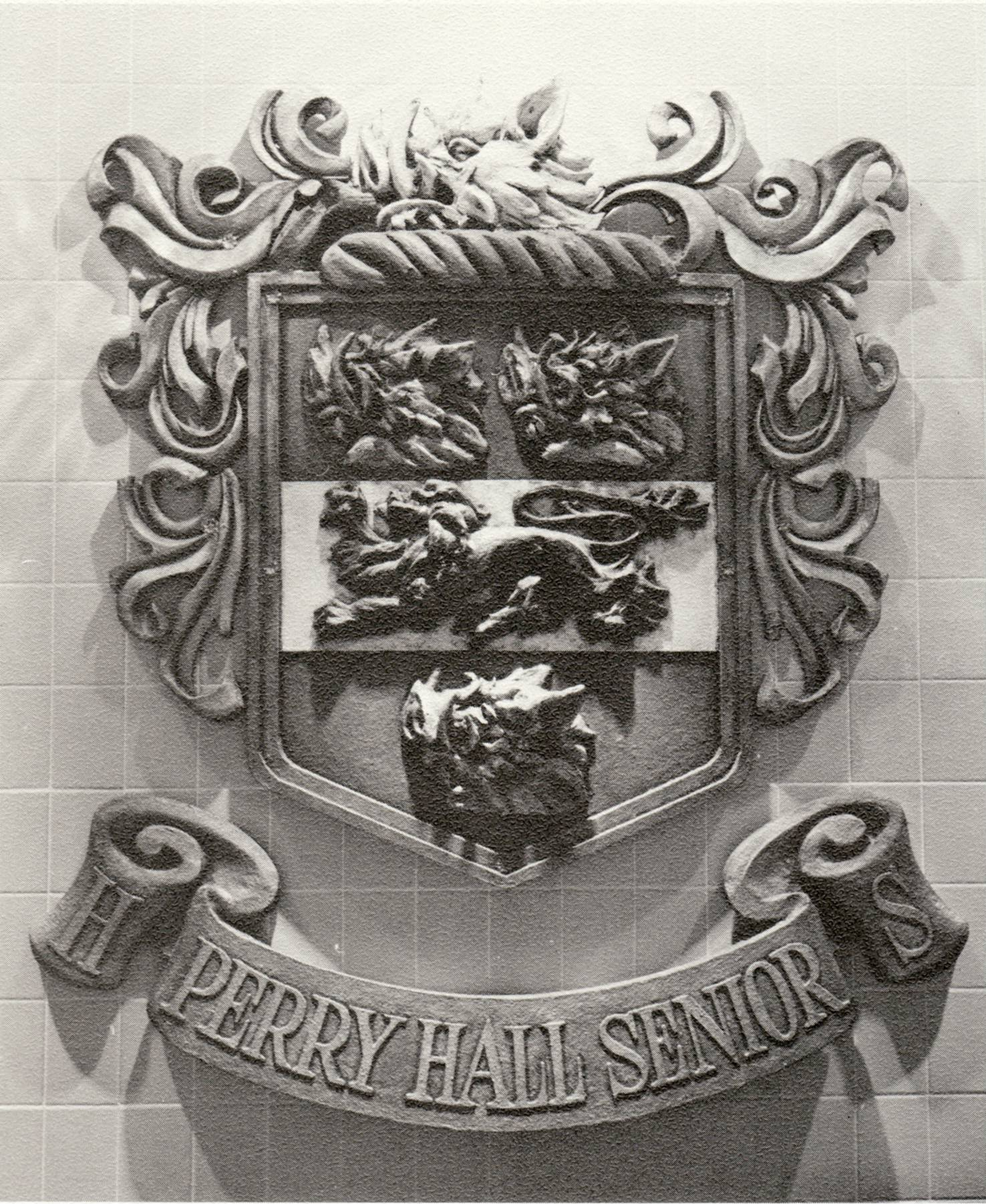
The Harry Dorsey Gough coat of arms

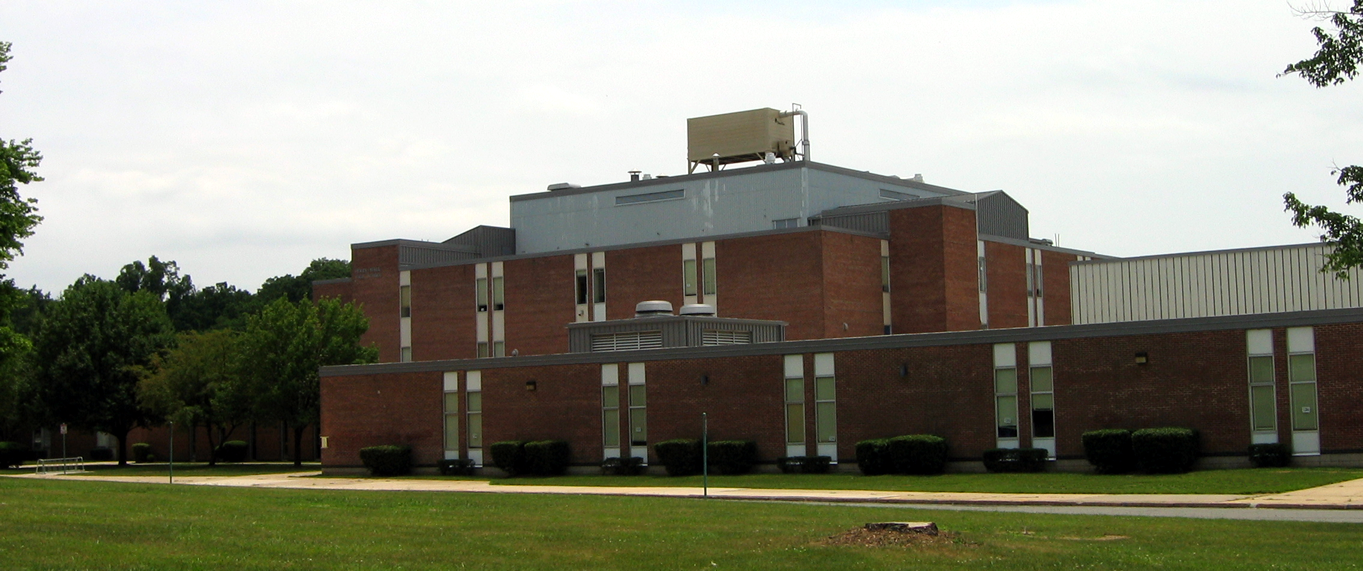
Perry Hall High School

Perry Hall High School was established in 1963 in the middle of a growing community. The doors opened on September 6 to sophomores and juniors, taking students that would have otherwise attended Parkville High School or Overlea High School. The first principal of Perry Hall High School was Maynard E. Keadle. Perry Hall High School's first graduates were members of the class of 1965. Within five years, a second building was constructed to accommodate the high number of students in the area. The new building opened in the fall of 1967 to Perry Hall High School students while the original building became Perry Hall Junior High School, known as Perry Hall Middle School today.

In 1987, the movie Hairspray was filmed at Perry Hall High School.

=== Overcrowding ===
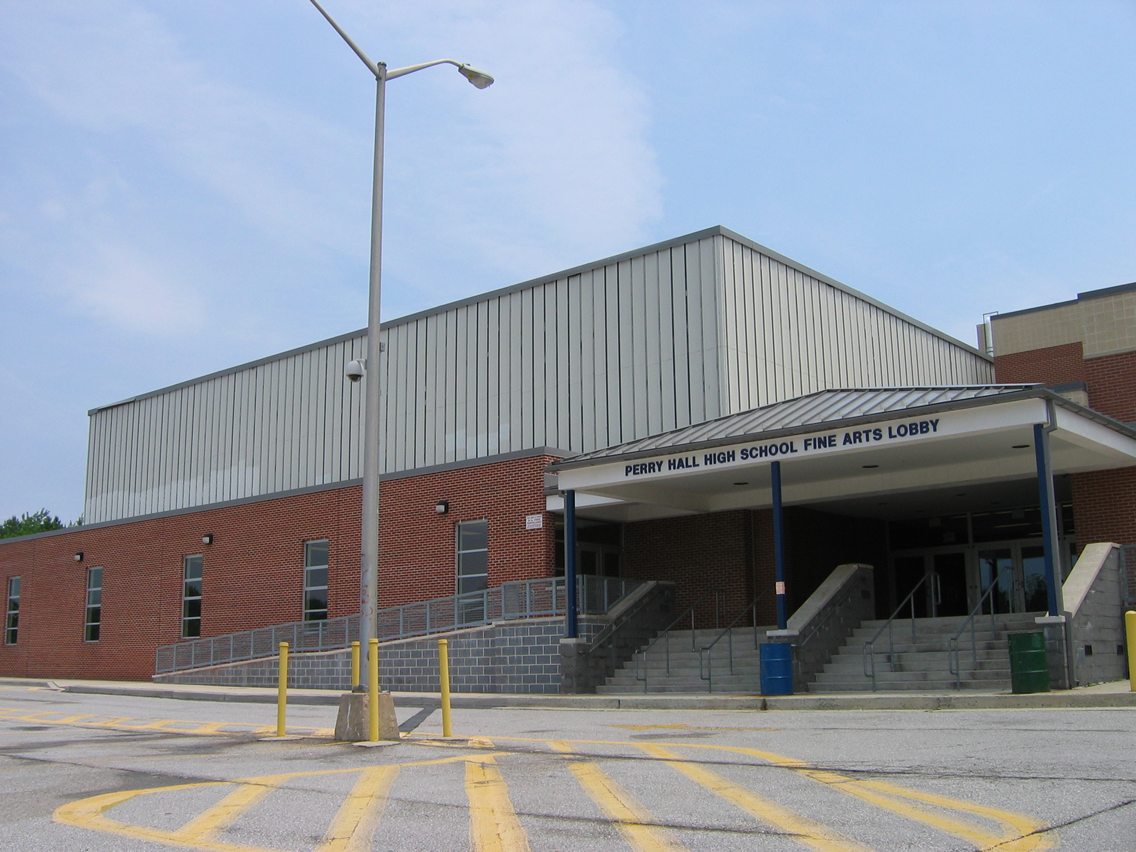
A new lobby constructed with the addition.

A new addition replaced portable classrooms at Perry Hall High School in 1997, but by 2003 portable classrooms were needed once again. In 2005, a new hallway was built to try to ease the overcrowded hallways. With Perry Hall High School being the most populated school in the Baltimore County public school system, the Perry Hall Improvement Association has started a petition to gather support for a new high school to be constructed in northeast Baltimore County.

== 2012 shooting ==
A shooting occurred at the Perry Hall cafeteria on the first day of school at 10:45 a.m., Monday, August 27, 2012. The shooter, 15-year-old sophomore student Robert Gladden, Jr., attended the first three classes and then went to the school restroom during lunch, where he allegedly left a backpack that contained a 16 gauge shotgun and assembled and loaded it. He exited the restroom with the shotgun hidden under his clothing and pulled it out in the cafeteria, where he opened fire. A 17-year-old male student with Down’s syndrome was shot in the lower back, critically wounding him. A school counselor, Jesse Wasmer, immediately rushed to subdue Gladden by pinning him against a vending machine. Richard Rosenthal, a mathematics teacher and more faculty members rushed Gladden, who fired into the ceiling during the struggle. Several people suffered minor cuts and bruises during the panic that ensued. Students were evacuated to a nearby shopping center and middle school. School operated as usual the following day.

In February 2013, Gladden was sentenced to 35 years in prison on charges of attempted murder.

== Academics ==
Perry Hall High school received a 54.7 out of a possible 100 points (54%) on the 2018-2019 Maryland State Department of Education Report Card and received a 3 out of 5 star rating, ranking in the 35th percentile among all Maryland schools.

== Students ==
The 2019–2020 enrollment at Perry Hall High School was 1969 students.

== Extracurricular activities ==
There are many clubs and activities in the arts, languages, music, career interests, and recreation from which students may choose:

=== Academic ===
- It's Academic
- Science Club
- Mock Trial

=== Art and Music ===
- Chamber Choir
- Concert Band
- Symphonic Band
- Symphonic Winds
- Wind Ensemble
- Guitar Ensemble
- Jazz Band
- Marching Gators
- Men's Chorus
- Mixed Chorale
- National Art Honor Society
- Symphony Orchestra
- Photography Club
- Tri-M
- Women's Chorus

== Athletics ==
Perry Hall has athletic teams for:

- Allied Sports
- Badminton
- Baseball
- Basketball
- Cheerleading
- Cross country
- Field Hockey
- Football
- Golf
- Lacrosse
- Softball
- Soccer
- Tennis
- Track
- Volleyball
- Wrestling

=== State championships ===
Girls Cross Country

- 4A 1993

Boys Cross Country

- Class AA 1987

Field Hockey

- Class AA 1982

Girls Soccer

- 4A 2018, 2019

Boys Soccer

- 4A 2015

Boys Basketball

- 4A 2017, 2018

Baseball

- 4A 1990, 1992, 1994

Softball

- Class AA 1979

== Notable alumni ==
- Diane Fanning (née Butcher), crime writer
- David Jackson, former NFL wide receiver
- Chuck Porter, former Major League Baseball player
- James F. Ports Jr., former member of Maryland House of Delegates
- Alfred W. Redmer Jr., former member of Maryland House of Delegates, current Maryland State Insurance Commissioner
- Tonja Walker, actress
