= Sollers Point Technical High School =

High school in Maryland, United States

Coordinates: 39°16′00″N 76°30′59″W

Sollers Point Technical High School is a public magnet school in Dundalk, Maryland, United States. It is part of the Baltimore County Public Schools system.

The school draws students from other public high schools in the system. The school day is split: students attend classes at both a normal "home" high-school as well as the technical school.

Sollers Point is one of the only high schools in the country to hold an ISO 9001 certification, providing education and training in a number of technical fields.

Sollers Point began operation in 1966. The original Sollers Point Technical High School building was demolished in 2012 and a new campus was built in 2013 that is now attached to Dundalk High School.

== Magnet Programs ==
Sollers Point offers 10 magnet programs to students who are trying to pursue a career in the technical program field in which they will take STEM courses at Sollers Point Technical High School.

Magnet Programs

- Academy of Health Professions
- Automotive Service Technology
- Baking & Pastry Arts
- Biomedical Science-PLTW
- Building and Construction Technology
- Cosmetology
- Culinary Arts
- Diesel Truck and Power System
- IT: Artificial Intelligence/Computer Science
- IT: Networking/Cybersecurity
