= King Gimp =

- Directed by: Susan Hannah Hadary; William A. Whiteford
- Written by: Dan Keplinger
- Produced by: Susan Hannah Hadary
- Starring: Paul Hungerford; Dan Keplinger
- Edited by: Geof Bartz
- Production companies: MedSchool Maryland Productions; Tapestry International Productions
- Distributed by: HBO; University of Maryland Video Press
- Release date: 1999
- Country: United States
- Language: English

King Gimp is a 1999 documentary that was awarded the 2000 Oscar for Best Short Subject Documentary and 2000 Peabody Award. King Gimp follows the life of artist Dan Keplinger of Towson, Maryland, who has cerebral palsy. Filmmakers Susan Hannah Hadary and William A. Whiteford, of the University of Maryland Video Press and Tapestry International Productions produced the film. Geof Bartz, A.C.E. edited the final version.

== The journey begins ==
Keplinger was 13 when the filmmakers met him as part of their federally funded documentary projects on mainstreaming children with disabilities. The cerebral palsy means Keplinger has little control over the muscles of his arms, legs or mouth. He uses a paintbrush attached to his head to paint. He could neither speak nor dress himself when the filmmakers met him. "They recorded Keplinger's move from a state school for disabled children into Parkville High School. They filmed him moving from his mother's home into his first apartment. His first art show, his friendship with a young woman hired to help him with homework, his senior prom and his tears at his college graduation -- all were captured on film," according to The Baltimore Sun. "King Gimp was the name neighbors gave him as a child because his house was on the top of a hill and he liked to roll down it in his wheelchair. A fighting spirit, he calls himself."

== HBO enters ==
As a mass communication major at Towson University, Keplinger helped write the script that would be used in the documentary, but the filmmakers ran out of money to complete the project. After viewing a 7-minute promo cut by Whiteford and Hadary at their Baltimore offices, HBO purchased the rights to the documentary for distribution on its premium channel, giving the filmmakers enough money for insert shots and to finish cutting the film.

The film was edited from 80 hours of raw footage and an 80-page memoir written by Keplinger. Initial rough cuts were done on videotape at the filmmakers' offices in Baltimore, MD by Whiteford, contributing editor Loye Miller, and assistant editor Alex Houston. After viewing them, HBO decided to bring postproduction to New York city, where Geof Bartz finished editing. HBO then transferred the 39-minute documentary to 16mm film and entered it into the Frame-by-Frame film festival in New York City, where it fulfilled its "Academy requirements" to be eligible for an Oscar nomination. The film was nominated and won. Keplinger caused a sensation at the Oscar ceremony when he jumped out of his wheelchair with excitement over the Hadary-Whiteford win. "It was cool to people who knew me," the artist said in The Washington Post. "Other people thought I was having a seizure. But I was just doing my victory dance." Its broadcast premiere was on June 5, 2000.

== Keplinger's art ==
He continued his painting career with a show at the Phyllis Kind Gallery in New York City in 2000. He returned to Towson University, where he had obtained a mass communication degree in 1998, to complete an art degree. Keplinger's art features large canvases with bold colors and many are self-portraits.
