= Dundalk High School =

Coordinates: 39°16′00″N 76°30′59″W

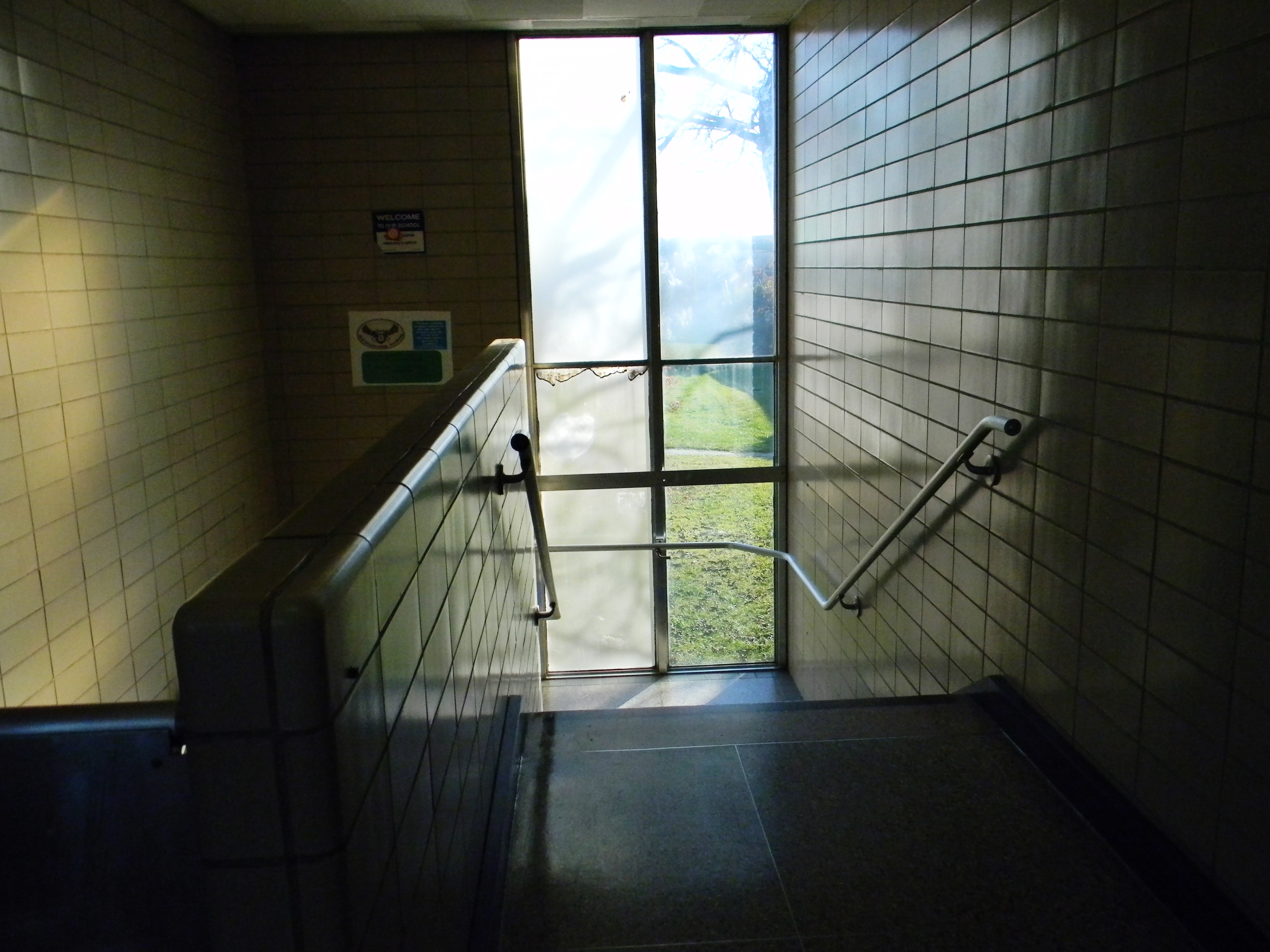
- Old Dundalk High School - 1959 to 2013 - has been torn down, and the new one is up and running. This photo is part of a set from a visit to the old school and a glance at the new one built next to it - on Delvale Avenue, in Dundalk, Baltimore County, Maryland U.S.

Location
- Dundalk, Maryland; United States

Information
- Type: Public Secondary
- Motto: Commitment to Excellence
- Established: 1888 (original); 1959; 2013 (current)
- School district: Baltimore County Public Schools
- NCES School ID: 240012000377
- Principal: Paul Satterfield
- Faculty: 94
- Grades: 9–12
- Enrollment: 1621 (2018–19)
- Campus: Suburban; 42.73 acres (172,900 m^{2})
- Colors: Green and Gold
- Mascot: Owl
- Accreditation: Middle States Association of Colleges and Secondary Schools; Maryland State Department of Education
- Website: dundalkhs.bcps.org

Dundalk High School (DHS) is a four-year public high school in the United States, located in Baltimore County, Maryland. The school opened in 1959. Starting in 2010, DHS was rebuilt and combined with Sollers Point Technical High School. The new building opened in 2013.

== About the school ==
Dundalk High School is located on Delvale Avenue in Dundalk, which is in the southeast part of Baltimore County and has roots back to 1888. In 1946, the former junior-senior high school building was opened. As the area's population grew, there was great need for a new high school. The high school building was originally built in 1959.

In 2010, the school district began construction on a new building to replace the aging infrastructure. The new facility opened on August 26, 2013, and houses both Dundalk High School and Sollers Point Technical High School. The new facility is modern and incorporates many environmentally beneficial features, such as automatic on-off lighting.

== Academics ==
Dundalk High school received a 42.7 out of a possible 100 points (42%) on the 2018-2019 Maryland State Department of Education Report Card and received a 2 out of 5 star rating, ranking in the 18th percentile among all Maryland schools.

== Students ==
The 2019–2020 enrollment at Dundalk High School was 1782 students.

The graduation rate at Dundalk High School peaked at 93% in 1999 and has dropped precipitously to 72.9% in 2014. The student population for 2018–19 was 1,621.

Student population history:

Year	Number of Students
2015	1,435
2014	1,309
2013	1,253
2012	1,221
2011	1,226
2010	1,234
2009	1,220
2008	1,223
2007	1,337
2006	1,366
2005	1,375
2004	1,387
2003	1,417
2002	1,425
2001	1,451
2000	1,450
1999	1,425
1998	1,331
1997	1,298
1996	1,253
1995	1,245
1994	1,211
1993	1,179

== Athletics ==
=== State championships ===
Football

1973 District State

Boys Cross Country

- Combined Class BCD 1946
- Class AA 1961

Boys Soccer

- Pre-MPSSAA Class B 1946
- Pre-MPSSAA Class A 1948
- One Class 1969, 1970
- Class AA 1974

Boys Indoor Track

- Class 3A 1990

Baseball

- Class AA 1983

== Notable alumni ==
- Nasire Best, perpetrator of the May 2026 White House shooting
- Mike Bielecki, former major league baseball player
- John Borozzi, former North American Soccer League and Major Indoor Soccer League, player.
- Ronnie Brown, gridiron football player
- Kevin Clash, muppeteer, creator/voice of Elmo on Sesame Street
- Louis L. DePazzo, former member of Maryland House of Delegates
- Bucky Lasek, professional skateboarder
- Richie Merritt, actor who played titular role in White Boy Rick
- Joseph J. Minnick, member of Maryland House of Delegates
- Jacob J. Mohorovic, Jr, former member of Maryland House of Delegates
- James Parrish, former National Football League player
- E. J. Pipkin, former member of Maryland Senate
- John R. Schneider, former member of Maryland Senate
- Bob Starr, semi-retired professional wrestler, trainer and manager
- Danny Wiseman, member of Professional Bowlers Association Hall of Fame

== See also ==
- List of schools in Baltimore County, Maryland
