= 2002 Maryland Senate election =

- November 5, 2002

All 47 seats of the Maryland Senate 24 seats needed for a majority
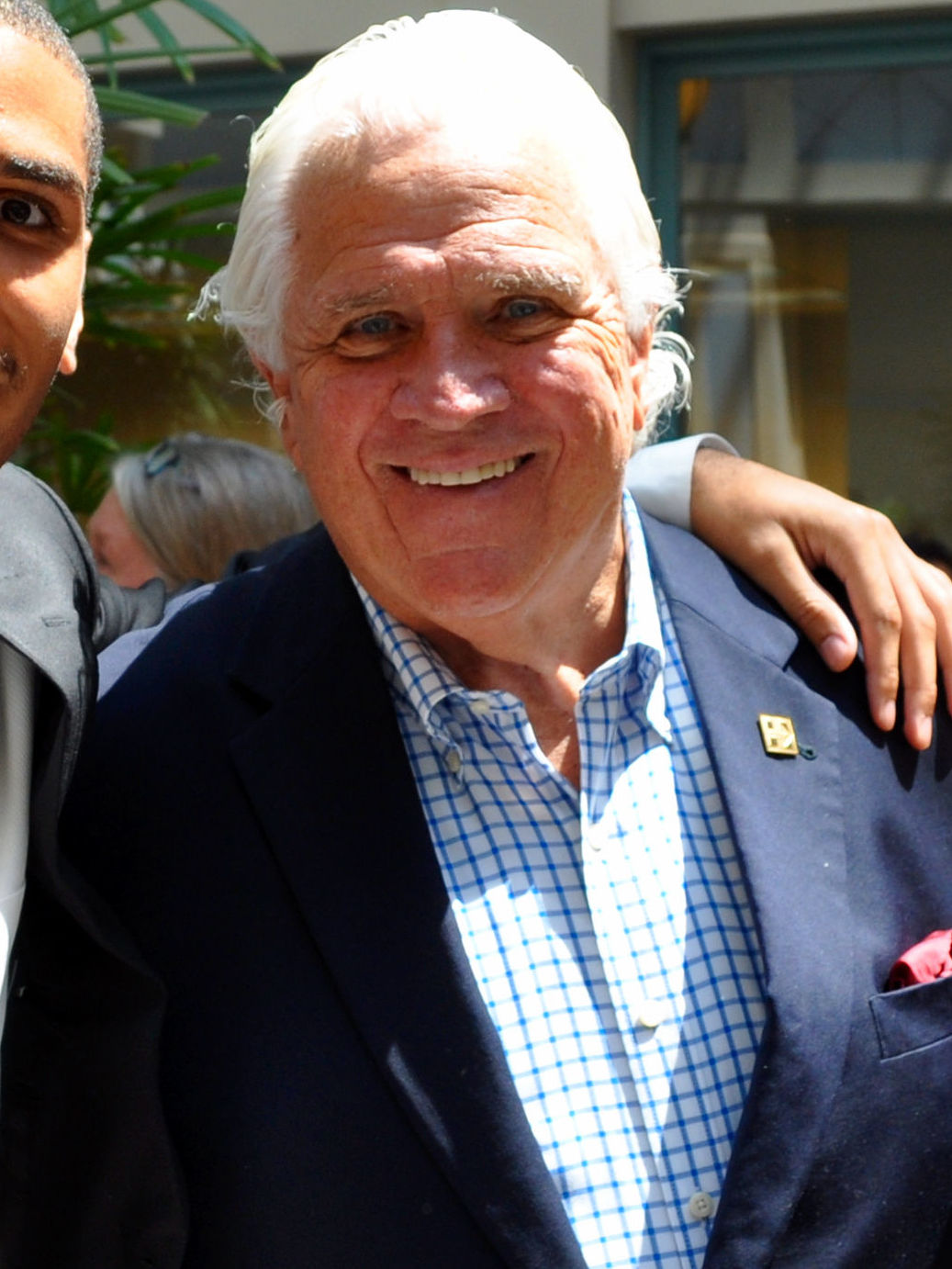

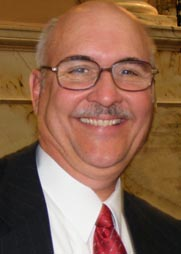
	Majority party	Minority party
Leader	Mike Miller	J. Lowell Stoltzfus
Party	Democratic	Republican
Leader since	January 21, 1987	September 27, 2001
Leader's seat	27th district	38th district
Last election	34	13
Seats won	33	14
Seat change	▼1	▲1
- Results: Democratic gain Republican gain Democratic hold Republican hold
President before election
Mike Miller
Democratic
President
Mike Miller
Democratic

The 2002 Maryland Senate election were held on November 5, 2002, to elect senators in all 47 districts of the Maryland Senate. Members were elected in single-member constituencies to four-year terms. These elections were held concurrently with various federal and state elections, including for Governor of Maryland.

== Summary ==
=== Closest races ===
Seats where the margin of victory was under 10%:

1. State Senate district 15, 1.91% (gain)
2. State Senate district 13, 2.03%
3. State Senate district 13, 2.08%
4. State Senate district 33, 8.42% (gain)

== Retiring incumbents ==
=== Democrats ===
1. District 18: Chris Van Hollen retired to run for Congress in Maryland's 8th congressional district.
2. District 41: Clarence W. Blount retired.
3. District 46: Perry Sfikas retired.

== Incumbents defeated ==
=== In primary elections ===
==== Democrats ====
1. District 21: Arthur Dorman lost renomination to John A. Giannetti Jr.
2. District 41: Barbara A. Hoffman lost a redistricting race to state delegate Lisa Gladden.
3. District 44: Clarence Mitchell IV lost renomination to Verna L. Jones.

==== Republicans ====
- District 4: Timothy R. Ferguson lost renomination to state delegate David R. Brinkley.

=== In general elections ===
==== Democrats ====
1. District 7: Diane DeCarlo lost a redistricting race to incumbent Andy Harris.
2. District 33: Robert R. Neall lost to Janet Greenip.
3. District 36: Walter M. Baker lost to E. J. Pipkin.

==== Republicans ====
1. District 15: Jean Roesser lost to Robert J. Garagiola.

== Predictions ==
Source	Ranking	As of
The Cook; Political Report	Safe D	October 4, 2002

== Detailed results ==
All election results are from the Maryland State Board of Elections.

=== District 1 ===
Maryland Senate District 1 election
Party	Candidate	Votes	%
Republican	John J. Hafer (incumbent)	29,602	99.4
Write-in		180	0.6
Republican hold			

=== District 2 ===
Maryland Senate District 2 election
Party	Candidate	Votes	%
Republican	Donald F. Munson (incumbent)	23,640	70.5
Democratic	Mary E. Newby	9,859	29.4
Write-in		17	0.1
Republican hold			

=== District 3 ===
Maryland Senate District 3 election
Party	Candidate	Votes	%
Republican	Alex Mooney (incumbent)	21,617	55.0
Democratic	Sue Hecht	17,654	44.9
Write-in		66	0.2
Republican hold			

=== District 4 ===
==== Republican primary ====
Maryland Senate District 4 Republican primary election
Party	Candidate	Votes	%
Republican	David R. Brinkley	5,559	52.8
Republican	Timothy R. Ferguson (incumbent)	4,005	38.1
Republican	David P. Gray	958	9.1

==== General election ====
Maryland Senate District 4 election
Party	Candidate	Votes	%
Republican	David R. Brinkley	29,231	76.4
Democratic	Timothy Schlauch	8,957	23.4
Write-in		82	0.2
Republican hold			

=== District 5 ===
Maryland Senate District 5 election
Party	Candidate	Votes	%
Republican	Larry E. Haines (incumbent)	35,749	74.2
Democratic	Ronald Zepp	12,399	25.7
Write-in		49	0.1
Republican hold			

=== District 6 ===
Maryland Senate District 6 election
Party	Candidate	Votes	%
Democratic	Norman R. Stone Jr.	25,156	98.1
Write-in		492	1.9
Democratic hold			

=== District 7 ===
==== Democratic primary ====
Maryland Senate District 7 Democratic primary election
Party	Candidate	Votes	%
Democratic	Diane DeCarlo (incumbent)	7,531	80.0
Democratic	Jerry Hersi	1,884	20.0

==== General election ====
Maryland Senate District 7 election
Party	Candidate	Votes	%
Republican	Andy Harris (incumbent)	23,374	57.8
Democratic	Diane DeCarlo (incumbent)	16,991	42.1
Write-in		44	0.1
Republican hold			

=== District 8 ===
Democratic state senator Thomas L. Bromwell resigned from the Maryland Senate on May 24, 2002, after Governor Parris Glendening appointed him to chair the Maryland Injured Workers' Insurance Fund. John R. Schneider, who Glendening appointed to replace Bromwell in the Senate, died from colon cancer on August 27, 2002. Therefore, the seat had no incumbent state senator.

==== Democratic primary ====
Maryland Senate District 8 Democratic primary election
Party	Candidate	Votes	%
Democratic	Kathy Klausmeier	10,463	85.2
Democratic	Raymond C. Shiflet	1,815	14.8

==== General election ====
Maryland Senate District 8 election
Party	Candidate	Votes	%
Democratic	Kathy Klausmeier	24,590	58.5
Republican	John W. E. Cluster Jr.	17,426	41.4
Write-in		55	0.1
Democratic hold			

=== District 9 ===
Maryland Senate District 9 election
Party	Candidate	Votes	%
Republican	Robert H. Kittleman (incumbent)	40,133	98.2
Write-in		746	1.8
Republican hold			

=== District 10 ===
Maryland Senate District 10 election
Party	Candidate	Votes	%
Democratic	Delores G. Kelley (incumbent)	29,638	80.8
Republican	Robbie Page	6,981	19.0
Write-in		63	0.2
Democratic hold			

=== District 11 ===
==== Democratic primary ====
Maryland Senate District 11 Democratic primary election
Party	Candidate	Votes	%
Democratic	Paula Hollinger (incumbent)	13,428	83.2
Democratic	Larry L. LeDoyen	2,705	16.8

==== General election ====
Maryland Senate District 11 election
Party	Candidate	Votes	%
Democratic	Paula Hollinger (incumbent)	29,009	62.5
Republican	Alan P. Zukerberg	17,336	37.4
Write-in		46	0.1
Democratic hold			

=== District 12 ===
==== Democratic primary ====
Maryland Senate District 12 Democratic primary election
Party	Candidate	Votes	%
Democratic	Edward J. Kasemeyer (incumbent)	9,269	83.1
Democratic	Frank C. Fillmore Jr.	1,889	16.9

==== General election ====
Maryland Senate District 12 election
Party	Candidate	Votes	%
Democratic	Edward J. Kasemeyer (incumbent)	25,537	63.2
Republican	Mike Sneeringer	14,843	36.7
Write-in		49	0.1
Democratic hold			

=== District 13 ===
==== Republican primary ====
Maryland Senate District 13 Republican primary election
Party	Candidate	Votes	%
Republican	Sandra B. Schrader (incumbent)	3,732	74.4
Republican	Edward L. Patrick	1,286	25.6

==== General election ====
Maryland Senate District 13 election
Party	Candidate	Votes	%
Republican	Sandra B. Schrader (incumbent)	20,375	51.0
Democratic	C. Vernon Gray	19,563	49.0
Write-in		32	0.1
Republican hold			

=== District 14 ===
In January 2002, Governor Parris Glendening appointed Robert H. Kittleman to succeed Christopher J. McCabe in the Maryland Senate following his resignation to serve as the Director of the Office of Intergovernmental Affairs within the U.S. Department of Health and Human Services. Following redistricting, the district had no incumbent.

==== Democratic primary ====
Maryland Senate District 14 Democratic primary election
Party	Candidate	Votes	%
Democratic	Rona E. Kramer	5,369	46.4
Democratic	Tod David Sher	4,900	42.3
Democratic	Matthew Mossburg	1,314	11.3

==== General election ====
Maryland Senate District 14 election
Party	Candidate	Votes	%
Democratic	Rona E. Kramer	22,938	60.7
Republican	Jorge Ribas	14,773	39.1
Write-in		51	0.1
Democratic hold			

=== District 15 ===
Maryland Senate District 15 election
Party	Candidate	Votes	%
Democratic	Robert J. Garagiola	20,121	50.9
Republican	Jean Roesser (incumbent)	19,366	49.0
Write-in		18	0.1
Democratic gain from Republican			

=== District 16 ===
Maryland Senate District 16 election
Party	Candidate	Votes	%
Democratic	Brian Frosh (incumbent)	32,478	72.1
Republican	Tom Devor	12,563	27.9
Write-in		30	0.1
Democratic hold			

=== District 17 ===
==== Democratic primary ====
Maryland Senate District 17 Democratic primary election
Party	Candidate	Votes	%
Democratic	Jennie M. Forehand (incumbent)	8,204	81.8
Democratic	Sidney Altman	1,825	18.2

==== General election ====
Maryland Senate District 17 election
Party	Candidate	Votes	%
Democratic	Jennie M. Forehand (incumbent)	21,494	71.0
Republican	Roy A. Burke II	8,737	28.9
Write-in		30	0.1
Democratic hold			

=== District 18 ===
==== Democratic primary ====
Maryland Senate District 18 Democratic primary election
Party	Candidate	Votes	%
Democratic	Sharon M. Grosfeld	7,527	48.9
Democratic	Steven P. Hollman	6,220	40.4
Democratic	Michael C. Griffiths	1,643	10.7

==== General election ====
Maryland Senate District 18 election
Party	Candidate	Votes	%
Democratic	Sharon M. Grosfeld	28,504	97.0
Write-in		877	3.0
Democratic hold			

=== District 19 ===
==== Republican primary ====
Maryland Senate District 19 Republican primary election
Party	Candidate	Votes	%
Republican	Lynn Siguenza	2,110	58.7
Republican	Luis F. Columba	1,483	41.3

==== General election ====
Maryland Senate District 19 election
Party	Candidate	Votes	%
Democratic	Leonard Teitelbaum (incumbent)	25,825	69.8
Republican	Lynn Siguenza	11,146	30.1
Write-in		37	0.1
Democratic hold			

=== District 20 ===
Maryland Senate District 20 election
Party	Candidate	Votes	%
Democratic	Ida G. Ruben (incumbent)	22,738	82.1
Republican	John W. Wrightson	4,885	17.6
Write-in		68	0.3
Democratic hold			

=== District 21 ===
==== Democratic primary ====
Maryland Senate District 21 Democratic primary election
Party	Candidate	Votes	%
Democratic	John A. Giannetti Jr.	4,365	51.3
Democratic	Arthur Dorman (incumbent)	4,140	48.7

==== General election ====
Maryland Senate District 21 election
Party	Candidate	Votes	%
Democratic	John A. Giannetti Jr.	18,767	97.1
Write-in		564	2.9
Democratic hold			

=== District 22 ===
==== Democratic primary ====
Maryland Senate District 22 Democratic primary election
Party	Candidate	Votes	%
Democratic	Paul G. Pinsky (incumbent)	8,240	76.0
Democratic	Richard R. Pilski	2,598	24.0

==== General election ====
Maryland Senate District 22 election
Party	Candidate	Votes	%
Democratic	Paul G. Pinsky (incumbent)	19,930	99.2
Write-in		169	0.8
Democratic hold			

=== District 23 ===
==== Democratic primary ====
Maryland Senate District 23 Democratic primary election
Party	Candidate	Votes	%
Democratic	Leo E. Green (incumbent)	9,406	56.5
Democratic	Bobby G. Henry Jr.	7,252	43.5

==== General election ====
Maryland Senate District 23 election
Party	Candidate	Votes	%
Democratic	Leo E. Green (incumbent)	29,387	79.9
Republican	Fran C. Shellenberger	7,374	20.0
Write-in		29	0.1
Democratic hold			

=== District 24 ===
==== Democratic primary ====
Maryland Senate District 24 Democratic primary election
Party	Candidate	Votes	%
Democratic	Nathaniel Exum (incumbent)	11,427	82.1
Democratic	Milton Grady	2,496	17.9

==== General election ====
Maryland Senate District 24 election
Party	Candidate	Votes	%
Democratic	Nathaniel Exum (incumbent)	21,570	99.6
Write-in		80	0.4
Democratic hold			

=== District 25 ===
==== Democratic primary ====
Maryland Senate District 25 Democratic primary election
Party	Candidate	Votes	%
Democratic	Ulysses Currie (incumbent)	10,544	64.6
Democratic	Sharrarne Morton	5,785	35.4

==== General election ====
Maryland Senate District 25 election
Party	Candidate	Votes	%
Democratic	Ulysses Currie (incumbent)	24,761	99.7
Write-in		85	0.3
Democratic hold			

=== District 26 ===
==== Democratic primary ====
Maryland Senate District 26 Democratic primary election
Party	Candidate	Votes	%
Democratic	Gloria G. Lawlah (incumbent)	12,343	69.3
Democratic	David Mercado Valderrama	3,240	18.2
Democratic	Zalee G. Harris	2,222	12.5

==== General election ====
Maryland Senate District 26 election
Party	Candidate	Votes	%
Democratic	Gloria G. Lawlah (incumbent)	12,343	99.4
Write-in		162	0.6
Democratic hold			

=== District 27 ===
==== Democratic primary ====
Maryland Senate District 27 Democratic primary election
Party	Candidate	Votes	%
Democratic	Thomas V. Miller Jr. (incumbent)	9,708	62.1
Democratic	Juanita D. Miller	5,203	33.3
Democratic	Minerva Sanders	710	4.5

==== General election ====
Maryland Senate District 27 election
Party	Candidate	Votes	%
Democratic	Thomas V. Miller Jr. (incumbent)	26,875	71.8
Republican	Toni Jarboe-Duley	10,512	28.1
Write-in		31	0.1
Democratic hold			

=== District 28 ===
Maryland Senate District 28 election
Party	Candidate	Votes	%
Democratic	Thomas M. Middleton (incumbent)	21,735	64.0
Republican	Jim Easter	12,221	36.0
Write-in		16	0.1
Democratic hold			

=== District 29 ===
Maryland Senate District 29 election
Party	Candidate	Votes	%
Democratic	Roy Dyson (incumbent)	20,532	58.2
Republican	Barbara R. Thompson	14,714	41.7
Write-in		20	0.1
Democratic hold			

=== District 30 ===
==== Republican primary ====
Maryland Senate District 30 Republican primary election
Party	Candidate	Votes	%
Republican	Andy Smarick	4,569	66.1
Republican	Nora Criss-McIntire Keenan	2,342	33.9

==== General election ====
Maryland Senate District 30 election
Party	Candidate	Votes	%
Democratic	John Astle (incumbent)	24,799	55.4
Republican	Andy Smarick	19,922	44.5
Write-in		44	0.1
Democratic hold			

=== District 31 ===
Maryland Senate District 31 election
Party	Candidate	Votes	%
Democratic	Philip C. Jimeno (incumbent)	23,381	62.3
Republican	David K. Kyle	14,100	37.6
Write-in		30	0.1
Democratic hold			

=== District 32 ===
Maryland Senate District 32 election
Party	Candidate	Votes	%
Democratic	James E. DeGrange Sr. (incumbent)	19,623	59.2
Republican	Terry R. Gilleland Jr.	13,490	40.7
Write-in		45	0.1
Democratic hold			

=== District 33 ===
Maryland Senate District 33 election
Party	Candidate	Votes	%
Republican	Janet Greenip	27,512	54.2
Democratic	Robert R. Neall (incumbent)	23,236	45.8
Write-in		24	0.1
Republican gain from Democratic			

=== District 34 ===
Maryland Senate District 34 election
Party	Candidate	Votes	%
Republican	Nancy Jacobs (incumbent)	20,474	60.4
Democratic	Art Helton	13,399	39.5
Write-in		45	0.1
Republican hold			

=== District 35 ===
==== Republican primary ====
Maryland Senate District 35 Republican primary election
Party	Candidate	Votes	%
Republican	J. Robert Hooper (incumbent)	7,600	63.1
Republican	Kenneth E. Unitas	2,695	22.4
Republican	Anthony M. DiPietro Jr.	1,741	14.5

==== General election ====
Maryland Senate District 35 election
Party	Candidate	Votes	%
Republican	J. Robert Hooper (incumbent)	42,766	98.1
Write-in		817	1.9
Republican hold			

=== District 36 ===
Maryland Senate District 36 election
Party	Candidate	Votes	%
Republican	E. J. Pipkin	24,827	62.5
Democratic	Walter M. Baker (incumbent)	14,898	37.5
Write-in		27	0.1
Republican gain from Democratic			

=== District 37 ===
==== Democratic primary ====
Maryland Senate District 37 Republican primary election
Party	Candidate	Votes	%
Democratic	Grason Eckel	6,530	76.5
Democratic	Ronald K. Warden Sr.	2,005	23.5

==== General election ====
Maryland Senate District 37 election
Party	Candidate	Votes	%
Republican	Richard F. Colburn (incumbent)	26,144	68.6
Democratic	Grason Eckel	11,925	31.3
Write-in		39	0.1
Republican hold			

=== District 38 ===
Maryland Senate District 38 election
Party	Candidate	Votes	%
Republican	J. Lowell Stoltzfus (incumbent)	27,328	68.7
Democratic	Robert Lee Marvel Jr.	12,432	31.2
Write-in		30	0.1
Republican hold			

=== District 39 ===
==== Democratic primary ====
Maryland Senate District 39 Democratic primary election
Party	Candidate	Votes	%
Democratic	Patrick J. Hogan (incumbent)	5,448	71.7
Democratic	David Bernhard	2,154	28.3

==== General election ====
Maryland Senate District 39 election
Party	Candidate	Votes	%
Democratic	Patrick J. Hogan (incumbent)	19,099	66.2
Republican	Robin Ficker	9,689	33.6
Write-in		65	0.2
Democratic hold			

=== District 40 ===
==== Democratic primary ====
Maryland Senate District 40 Democratic primary election
Party	Candidate	Votes	%
Democratic	Ralph M. Hughes (incumbent)	9,777	83.3
Democratic	Desiree M. Dodson	1,957	16.7

==== General election ====
Maryland Senate District 40 election
Party	Candidate	Votes	%
Democratic	Ralph M. Hughes (incumbent)	19,189	99.6
Write-in		81	0.4
Democratic hold			

=== District 41 ===
==== Democratic primary ====
Maryland Senate District 41 Democratic primary election
Party	Candidate	Votes	%
Democratic	Lisa Gladden	10,084	49.4
Democratic	Barbara A. Hoffman (incumbent)	8,833	43.3
Democratic	Frank Boston	1,486	7.3

==== General election ====
Maryland Senate District 41 election
Party	Candidate	Votes	%
Democratic	Lisa Gladden	25,461	97.4
Write-in		673	2.6
Democratic hold			

=== District 42 ===
Maryland Senate District 42 election
Party	Candidate	Votes	%
Democratic	James Brochin	22,709	51.0
Republican	Martha Scanlan Klima	21,781	48.9
Write-in		45	0.1
Democratic hold			

=== District 43 ===
Maryland Senate District 43 election
Party	Candidate	Votes	%
Democratic	Joan Carter Conway	24,244	99.5
Write-in		127	0.5
Democratic hold			

=== District 44 ===
==== Democratic primary ====
Maryland Senate District 44 Democratic primary election
Party	Candidate	Votes	%
Democratic	Verna L. Jones	7,384	68.5
Democratic	Clarence Mitchell IV (incumbent)	3,389	31.5

==== General election ====
Maryland Senate District 44 election
Party	Candidate	Votes	%
Democratic	Verna L. Jones	16,135	99.5
Write-in		80	0.5
Democratic hold			

=== District 45 ===
==== Democratic primary ====
Maryland Senate District 45 Democratic primary election
Party	Candidate	Votes	%
Democratic	Nathaniel J. McFadden (incumbent)	9,194	81.4
Democratic	Frederick A. Broccolino	2,097	18.6

==== General election ====
Maryland Senate District 45 election
Party	Candidate	Votes	%
Democratic	Nathaniel J. McFadden (incumbent)	19,016	84.0
Republican	Gordon T. Gates	3,613	16.0
Write-in		19	0.1
Democratic hold			

=== District 46 ===
Maryland Senate District 46 election
Party	Candidate	Votes	%
Democratic	George W. Della Jr. (incumbent)	16,825	99.0
Write-in		177	1.04
Democratic hold			

=== District 47 ===
==== Democratic primary ====
Maryland Senate District 47 Democratic primary election
Party	Candidate	Votes	%
Democratic	Gwendolyn T. Britt	3,078	34.0
Democratic	Darren Swain	2,251	24.8
Democratic	Tommie Broadwater	2,051	22.6
Democratic	Malinda Genevia Miles	1,069	11.8
Democratic	David Henry Otero	270	3.0
Democratic	Kay Young	194	2.1
Democratic	Allieu B. Kallay	150	1.7

==== General election ====
Maryland Senate District 47 election
Party	Candidate	Votes	%
Democratic	Gwendolyn T. Britt	14,163	99.4
Write-in		82	0.6
Democratic hold			
