= Robert C. Baldwin =

American politician

Member of the Maryland House of Delegates from the 33rd district
- In office 1994 – January 8, 2003
- Preceded by: John G. Gary; Elizabeth S. Smith
- Succeeded by: Robert A. Costa

Personal details
- Born: November 13, 1934 (age 91) Annapolis, Maryland, U.S.
- Died: January 10, 2016
- Party: Republican

Robert C. Baldwin (November 13, 1934 – January 10, 2016) was an American politician, who served as a member of the Maryland House of Delegates from 1994 until 2002, when he chose not to run for reelection. He died on January 10, 2016, aged 81.

== Background ==
Baldwin was first elected to the Maryland House of Delegates in 1994 when he won a seat left open by John G. Gary, who was elected as County Executive for Anne Arundel County, and Elizabeth S. Smith. Baldwin's district was a portion of Anne Arundel County, Maryland. In 1998, Baldwin was reelected, along with fellow Republicans David Boschert and Janet Greenip. Baldwin did not run for reelection in 2002.

Baldwin attended St. Mary's High School, Annapolis. After high school, he attended Loyola College of Baltimore, graduating in 1956 with a B.S. in business administration, graduating as a distinguished military student.

After college, Baldwin served in the United States Army, reaching the rank of Infantry Captain. Until he was elected to office, Baldwin served in private business. Baldwin was active in his community, first serving as a member of the Federal Small Business Advisory Board, Region III, from 1982 to 1984. Later he was a member of the Council on Management and Productivity, serving from 1999 until 2002. Baldwin served on the Board of Directors of Anne Arundel Community College Foundation from 1992 until 1998.

During his tenure as a member of the House of Delegates, Baldwin served on the Appropriations Committee from 1995 to 1998. From 1999 until 2003, he was a member of the Environmental Matters Committee. Baldwin did not run for reelection in 2002.

== Election results ==
- 1998 Race for Maryland House of Delegates – District 33A

Voters choose three:

Name	Votes	Percent	Outcome
Janet Greenip, Rep.	23,256	20%	Won
Robert C. Baldwin, Rep.	23,050	20%	Won
David Boschert, Rep.	23,173	20%	Won
Gayle Powell, Dem.	16,145	14%	Lost
Marcia Richard, Dem.	15,210	13%	Lost
Shelia Schneider, Dem.	14,648	13%	Lost

- 1994 Race for Maryland House of Delegates – District 33A

Voters choose three:

Name	Votes	Percent	Outcome
Janet Greenip, Rep.	19,545	20%	Won
Robert C. Baldwin, Rep.	19,628	20%	Won
Marsha G. Perry, Dem.	17,618	18%	Won
David Almy, Rep.	16,390	17%	Lost
David G. Boschert, Dem.	13,485	14%	Lost
Michael F. Canning, Dem.	12,157	12%	Lost
