= Community College of Baltimore County =

Public college in Baltimore County, Maryland, US

- Type: Public community college
- Established: 1957 (Catonsville and Essex Community Colleges); 1971 (Dundalk Community College); 1998 (The three colleges are combined to form CCBC)
- President: Sandra Kurtinitis, Ph.D.
- Students: 70,000
- Location: Baltimore County, Maryland, United States
- Campus: CCBC Catonsville 39°15′9″N 76°44′6″W CCBC Dundalk 39°16′1″N 76°30′47″W CCBC Essex 39°21′13″N 76°28′53″W
- Mascots: Cardinals (Catonsville), Knights (Essex), Lions (Dundalk),
- Website: http://www.ccbcmd.edu

The Community College of Baltimore County (CCBC) is a public community college in Baltimore County, Maryland, with three main campuses and three extension centers.

== Academics ==
CCBC has more than 100 associate degree and certificate programs in a wide range of fields. Annual enrollment is greater than 72,000 students, most of whom live in the surrounding communities. The college has nationwide and international ties as well, with the student body representing 55 countries. The Catonsville, Dundalk, and Essex campuses each have an Honors Program for day and evening students.

== Campuses ==
CCBC has three main campuses located in the Catonsville, Dundalk, and Essex communities of Baltimore County, Maryland, as well as extension centers located in the Hunt Valley, Owings Mills, and Randallstown communities of Baltimore County. Each campus started as its own college, with Hunt Valley, Owings Mills, and Randallstown centers being extensions to Catonsville Community College, however, in 1998 the separate colleges of Catonsville, Dundalk, and Essex merged to form the Community College of Baltimore County.

=== Catonsville Campus ===
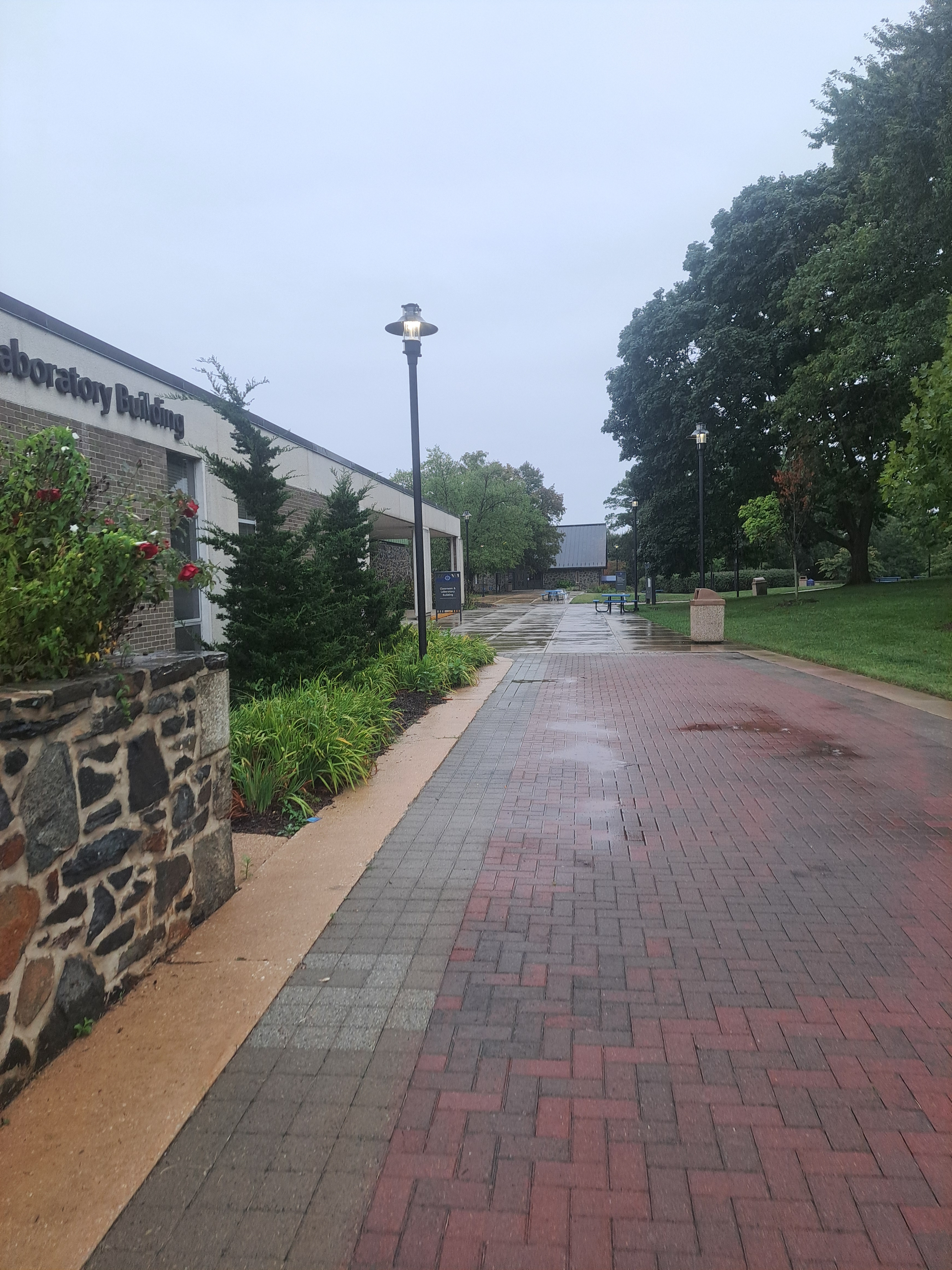
CCBC Catonsville

Currently located at 800 South Rolling Road, Catonsville, Maryland, and approximately one mile west of the Baltimore Beltway, the Catonsville campus of CCBC originated in 1957 as Catonsville Community College (CCC). Originally, the college operated out of the basement of Catonsville High School with an enrollment of 53 students, and shared a curriculum with that of Essex Community College, founded at the same time. Between 1959 and 1963, the County Board of Education raised funds to purchase a permanent campus for the college, eventually buying the Knapp Estate (a dairy farm in Catonsville). The construction on new classroom buildings began in 1962. As of 2005, the CCBC Catonsville campus has 19 buildings. The former manor / farm house was added to the National Register of Historic Places in 1980. The campus mascot is the cardinal.

=== Dundalk Campus ===
Community College of Baltimore County Dundalk Campus is one of the three main campuses of CCBC which was started in 1970 and built in 1971. As of 2005 it has 16 buildings, and houses the Baltimore County police training academy. Its signature gardens serve as living classrooms for students and areas of tranquil beauty for campus visitors. The campus mascot is the lion.

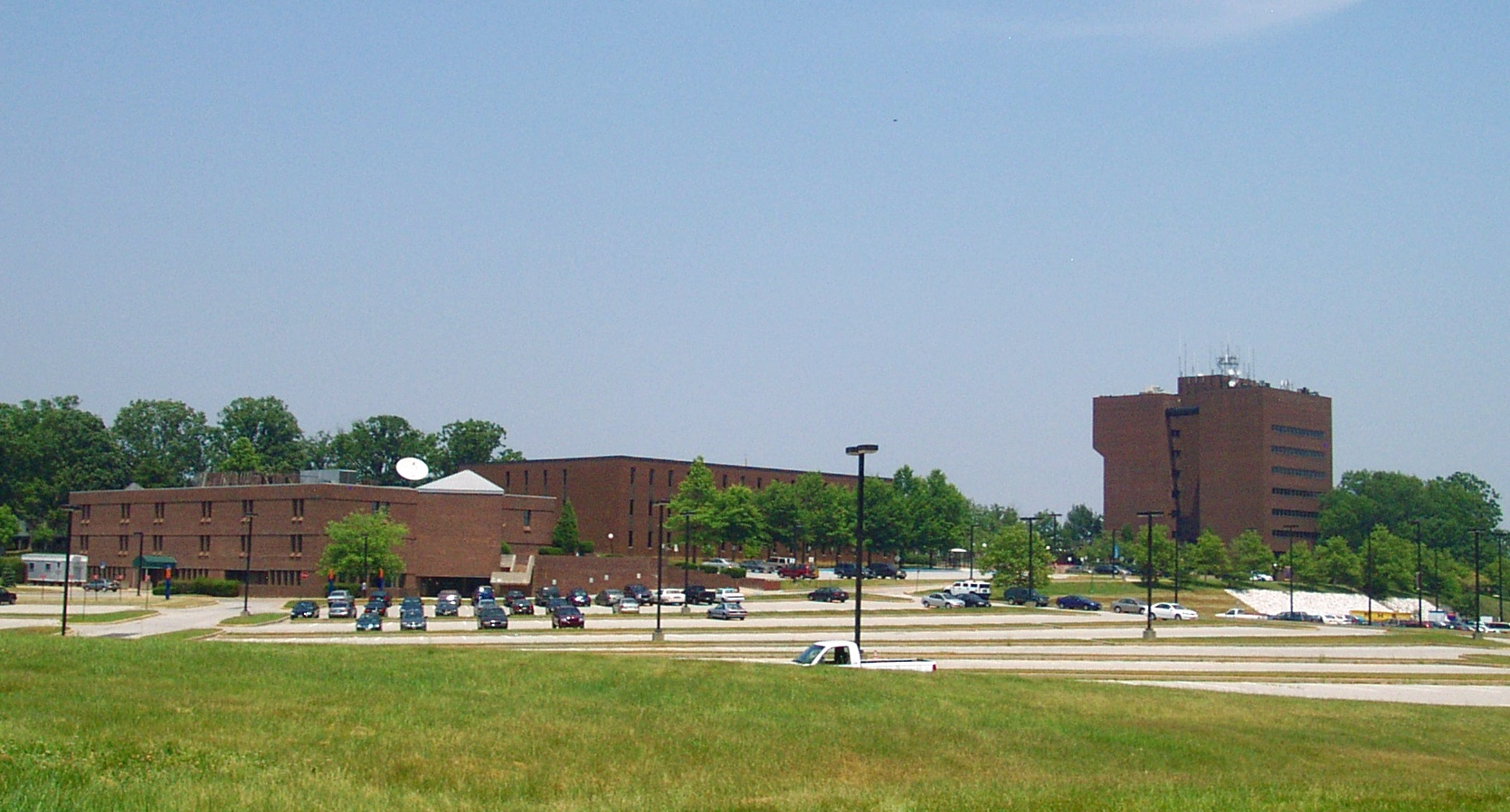
CCBC - Essex Campus - June 2005

=== Essex Campus ===
Currently located at 7201 Rossville Boulevard, Essex, Maryland, the Essex Campus of CCBC originated in 1957 as Essex Community College. Originally, the college operated out of Kenwood High School with an enrollment of 59 and shared a curriculum with that of Catonsville Community College. Jokingly, it is referred to by many of its students as The University of Rossville Boulevard. As of 2005, it has 14 buildings. The campus mascot is the knight. CCBC Essex has one of the top rated associate nursing programs in the region.

== Extension centers ==
CCBC has a number of extension centers around Baltimore County, most notably in Hunt Valley, Owings Mills, and Randallstown.

=== Hunt Valley Extension Center ===
Community College of Baltimore County Hunt Valley Campus is one of the three supplemental campuses of CCBC. It uses a leased building located in 11101 McCormick Road, a business park in Hunt Valley, Maryland.

=== Owings Mills Extension Center ===
Community College of Baltimore County Owings Mills Campus is the second of the two supplemental campuses of CCBC. It used a leased building located at 110 Painters Mill Road in Owings Mills, Maryland until 2013, when it moved into a brand new building of its own along with the Baltimore County Public Library in Owings Mills on the (new) Grand Central Avenue (also in Owings Mills, Maryland), near the Owings Mills Metro Train Station.

=== Randallstown Extension Center ===
The Community College of Baltimore County introduced a new campus at the Liberty Center in the Randallstown Plaza Shopping Center in January 2011.

== Notable alumni ==
- Sonny Askew – Professional soccer player
- Talmadge Branch – Politician and member of Maryland House of Delegates
- Thomas L. Bromwell – Politician
- Joan Carter Conway – Politician and Maryland State Senator
- Glynn Davis – Professional baseball player
- Too Tall Hall – Harlem Globetrotters player
- Mel Kiper, Jr. – Sports analyst
- J.B. Jennings – Politician and Minority Leader of the Maryland State Senate
- Kathy Klausmeier – Politician and Baltimore County Executive
- Jeff Nelson – Professional baseball player
- James F. Ports, Jr. – Politician and Maryland State Delegate
- Mike Rowe – Television host
- Matthew VanDyke – Documentary filmmaker, revolutionary, and journalist
