= David G. Boschert =

American politician

Member of the Maryland House of Delegates from the 33A district
- In office January 13, 1999 – January 10, 2007
- Preceded by: Marsha G. Perry
- Succeeded by: James King

Personal details
- Born: July 30, 1947 Annapolis, Maryland
- Died: June 30, 2011 (aged 63) Crownsville, Maryland
- Party: Democratic (before 1998); Republican (1998–2011)
- Education: University of Maryland

David George Boschert (July 30, 1947 – June 30, 2011) was an American politician. Boschert was most recently a Republican member of the Maryland House of Delegates, representing District 33A in the Maryland General Assembly. During his political career he played roles in both the Republican Party and Democratic Party.

== Background ==
Boschert was a captain in the U.S. Marine Corps and served in Vietnam.

Boschert held a number of sales and customer oriented jobs early in his life. He worked for local banks in various capacities, including as a branch manager and President for Public Relations, from 1979 to 1990. In 1987 he started his own company, Community Image Consultants, Inc., but it proved unsuccessful.

From 1980 to 1982, Boschert was the head of the Anne Arundel County Board of Appeals, which primarily deals with zoning issues.

From 1984 to 1994, Boschert served as a Democratic member of the County Council for District 4 of Anne Arundel County, Maryland. He served as Chairman of the Council from 1992 to 1994. While in office, the County passed legislation limiting the Council to two terms. After two terms, Boschert ran for a District 33 Delegate seat in 1994, but lost. He switched political parties prior to the 1998 election. In 1998, Boschert ran again for the 33rd district seat and won.

Boschert was appointed by Governor Parris Glendening in 2000 as Executive Director of the Annapolis Regional Transportation Management Association.

In 2003, Boschert began a run for Congress in Maryland's 3rd Congressional District, but later withdrew to avoid a challenge by Bob Duckworth, who went on to be the Republican nominee. Boschert subsequently chose to retire from the state House of Delegates and run for the Republican nomination for County Executive in 2006 to replace Janet Owens, who was term limited. He lost the nomination to Delegate John Leopold, who went on to defeat George F. Johnson, IV in the general election. Leopold was later ousted from office due to several scandals.

Later in his life, Boschert taught political science classes part-time at Anne Arundel Community College, located in Arnold, Maryland.

== House of Delegates ==
Boschert served in the Maryland House of Delegates from 1999 to 2007. While serving in the state legislature, Boschert was a member of the powerful Ways & Means Committee. Boschert upset his party and Republican Governor Bob Ehrlich early in the 2003 legislative term when he opposed the governor's slot machine legislation. Boschert ignored a heavy lobbying effort and voted to kill the Governor's proposal in Committee.

Later, Boschert returned to the good graces of the Republican Party in part by voting for the former Governor's proposals, including supporting the effort to install slots at racetracks. Throughout his career, Boschert cultivated a moderate image, though he co-sponsored a Maryland state Constitutional Amendment banning gay marriage.

== Personal life/death ==
Boschert earned an Associate of Arts degree in political science from Anne Arundel Community College in 1978 and a Bachelor of Science in Business Management from the University of Maryland, College Park in 1981.

Boschert lived in Crownsville, Maryland. He was married and had a grown son and daughter. He died from cancer in 2011.

== Election results ==
- 2002 Race for Maryland House of Delegates – District 33A

Voters choose two:

Name	Votes	Percent	Outcome
David Boschert, Rep.	20,279	26.3%	Won
Tony McConkey, Rep.	16,157	20%	Won
Jim Snider, Dem.	11,427	18.6%	Lost
Steve Rizzi, Dem.	10,939	17.8%	Lost
Michael Anthony Lagana, Ind.	2,622	4.3%	Lost
Other Write-Ins	31	0.1%	Lost

- 1998 Race for Maryland House of Delegates – District 33A

Voters choose three:

Name	Votes	Percent	Outcome
Janet Greenip, Rep.	23,256	20%	Won
Robert C. Baldwin, Rep.	23,050	20%	Won
David Boschert, Rep.	23,173	20%	Won
Gayle Powell, Dem.	16,145	14%	Lost
Marcia Richard, Dem.	15,210	13%	Lost
Shelia Schneider, Dem.	14,648	13%	Lost

- 1994 Race for Maryland House of Delegates – District 33A

Voters choose three:

Name	Votes	Percent	Outcome
Janet Greenip, Rep.	19,545	20%	Won
Robert C. Baldwin, Rep.	19,628	20%	Won
Marsha G. Perry, Dem.	17,618	18%	Won
David Almy, Rep.	16,390	17%	Lost
David G. Boschert, Dem.	13,485	14%	Lost
Michael F. Canning, Dem.	12,157	12%	Lost

== Sources ==
- Federal Election Commission Campaign Finance Reports and Data
- Maryland State Board of Elections Campaign Finance Database
- OpenSecrets.org Federal Campaign Finance Information
- http://www.hometownannapolis.com/cgi-bin/read/2006/09_03-76/OPN
