= Perry Hall, Maryland =

- Census-designated place
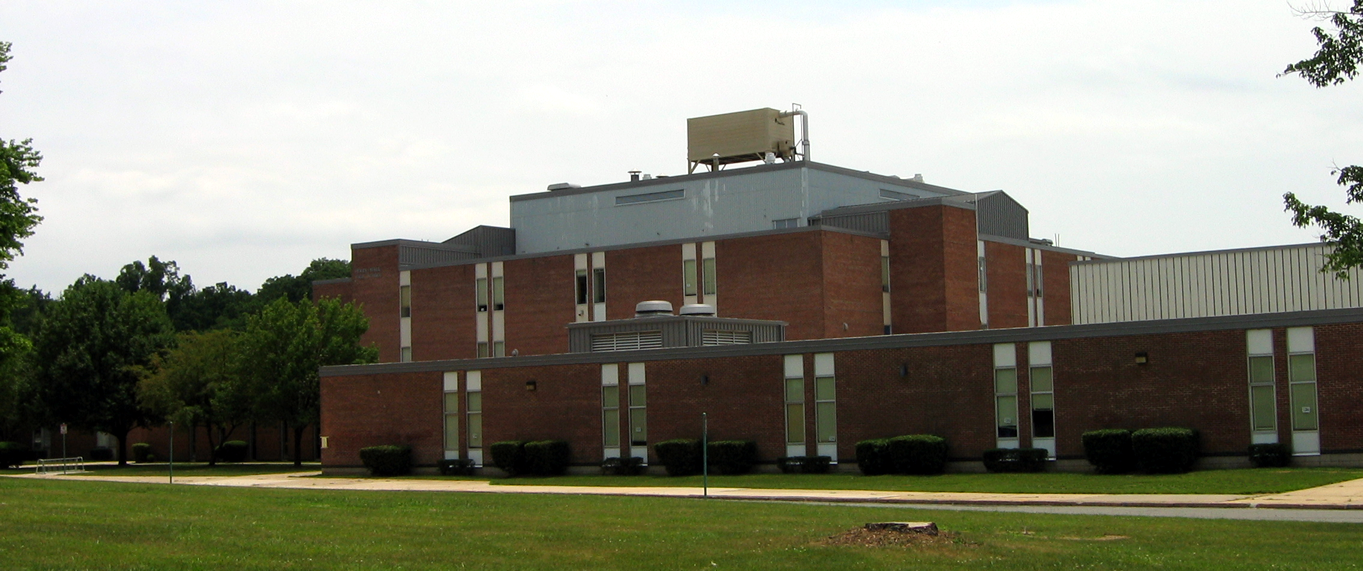
- Perry Hall High School in Perry Hall, Maryland

- Location of Perry Hall, Maryland
- Coordinates: 39°24′5″N 76°28′44″W
- Country: United States
- State: Maryland
- County: Baltimore
- Named for: Perry Hall Mansion

Area
  - Total: 6.94 sq mi (17.97 km^{2})
  - Land: 6.94 sq mi (17.97 km^{2})
  - Water: 0.0039 sq mi (0.01 km^{2})
- Elevation: 253 ft (77 m)

Population (2020)
  - Total: 29,409
  - Density: 4,239.3/sq mi (1,636.79/km^{2})
- Time zone: UTC−5 (Eastern (EST))
  - Summer (DST): UTC−4 (EDT)
- ZIP codes: 21128, 21234, 21236
- Area code: 410
- FIPS code: 24-60975
- GNIS feature ID: 0590995

Perry Hall is an unincorporated community and census-designated place in Baltimore County, Maryland, United States. The population was 28,474 at the 2010 census. It is a suburb of Baltimore.

== Geography ==
Perry Hall is located at 39°24′5″N 76°28′44″W.

According to the United States Census Bureau, the CDP has a total area of 7.0 square miles (18 km^{2}), all land.

== History ==
=== Germantown ===
Germantown was a community located in Baltimore County, Maryland, United States. It is part of Perry Hall, and also known as North Perry Hall.

Originally, Germantown was centered at the intersection of U.S. Highway 1, also known as Belair Road, and Forge Road. Forge Road branched to the east of Belair Road from Germantown, Baltimore County, Maryland.

== Education ==
=== Elementary schools ===
- Perry Hall Elementary
- Gunpowder Elementary
- Seven Oaks Elementary
- Joppa View Elementary
- Chapel Hill Elementary
- Honeygo Elementary
- Rossville Elementary

=== Middle schools ===
- Perry Hall Middle

Perry Hall Middle School is the largest middle school in Baltimore County. Current enrollment is 1851 students. The state rated school capacity is 1643. Enrollment projections released by Baltimore County Public Schools on Feb 20, 2017, indicate Perry Hall Middle School will have 2075 students in the 2018–19 school year. As of Feb 25, 2017, The Baltimore County Board of Education has not released any information on a plan to alleviate the overcapacity situation. http://www.bcps.org/schools/profile.aspx?OrgID=103, https://www.boarddocs.com/mabe/bcps/Board.nsf/files/AJDM3R56FD9D/$file/SC2016%20FINAL%20020217.pdf

Some students are zoned to attend Pine Grove Middle in Carney.

=== High schools ===
- Perry Hall High School

=== Private schools ===
- Perry Hall Christian School

== Demographics ==
Historical population
Census	Pop.	Note	%±
1970	5,446		—
1980	13,455		147.1%
1990	22,723		68.9%
2000	28,705		26.3%
2010	28,474		−0.8%
2020	29,409		3.3%
U.S. Decennial Census

=== Racial and ethnic composition ===
Perry Hall CDP, Maryland – Racial and ethnic composition Note: the US Census treats Hispanic/Latino as an ethnic category. This table excludes Latinos from the racial categories and assigns them to a separate category. Hispanics/Latinos may be of any race.
Race / Ethnicity (NH = Non-Hispanic)	Pop 2000	Pop 2010	Pop 2020	% 2000	% 2010	% 2020
White alone (NH)	25,197	22,127	18,554	87.78%	77.71%	63.09%
Black or African American alone (NH)	1,282	2,683	4,528	4.47%	9.42%	15.40%
Native American or Alaska Native alone (NH)	33	40	45	0.11%	0.14%	0.15%
Asian alone (NH)	1,455	2,318	3,832	5.07%	8.14%	13.03%
Native Hawaiian or Pacific Islander alone (NH)	7	2	9	0.02%	0.01%	0.03%
Other race alone (NH)	18	31	120	0.06%	0.11%	0.41%
Mixed race or Multiracial (NH)	283	518	1,216	0.99%	1.82%	4.13%
Hispanic or Latino (any race)	430	755	1,105	1.50%	2.65%	3.76%
Total	28,705	28,474	29,409	100.00%	100.00%	100.00%

=== 2022 estimates ===
As of the 2022 American Community Survey estimates, there were 29,255 people and 11,062 households. The population density was 4,217.2 inhabitants per square mile (1,628.3/km^{2}). There were 11,472 housing units at an average density of 1,653.7 per square mile (638.5/km^{2}). The racial makeup of the city was 62.8% White, 16.3% Black or African American, 14.5% Asian, and 1.5% some other race, with 4.9% from two or more races. Hispanics or Latinos of any race were 5.6% of the population.

Of the 11,062 households, 32.9% had children under the age of 18 living with them, 33.0% had seniors 65 years or older living with them, 53.4% were married couples living together, 5.0% were couples cohabitating, 16.3% had a male householder with no partner present, and 25.3% had a female householder with no partner present. The median household size was 2.64 and the median family size was 3.20.

The age distribution was 21.7% under 18, 8.7% from 18 to 24, 24.6% from 25 to 44, 27.5% from 45 to 64, and 17.5% who were 65 or older. The median age was 38.9 years.

The median income for a household was $103,061, with family households having a median income of $125,106 and non-family households $70,091. The per capita income was $46,861. Out of the 29,166 people with a determined poverty status, 7.9% were below the poverty line. Further, 15.3% of minors and 4.6% of seniors were below the poverty line.

In the survey, residents self-identified with various ethnic ancestries. People of German descent make up 20.8% of the population of the town, followed by Irish at 16.0%, Italian at 9.1%, English at 7.5%, Polish at 5.0%, American at 2.0%, Sub-Saharan African at 1.5%, French at 1.3%, Scottish at 1.0%, Greek at 0.9%, Welsh at 0.8%, Scotch-Irish at 0.7%, Norwegian at 0.5%, and Russian at 0.5%.

=== 2020 census ===
As of the 2020 census, Perry Hall had a population of 29,409. The median age was 40.4 years. 21.4% of residents were under the age of 18 and 17.7% of residents were 65 years of age or older. For every 100 females there were 89.8 males, and for every 100 females age 18 and over there were 87.0 males age 18 and over.

99.6% of residents lived in urban areas, while 0.4% lived in rural areas.

There were 11,480 households in Perry Hall, of which 31.6% had children under the age of 18 living in them. Of all households, 50.9% were married-couple households, 15.1% were households with a male householder and no spouse or partner present, and 28.6% were households with a female householder and no spouse or partner present. About 24.7% of all households were made up of individuals and 10.9% had someone living alone who was 65 years of age or older.

There were 11,960 housing units, of which 4.0% were vacant. The homeowner vacancy rate was 1.4% and the rental vacancy rate was 6.7%.

Racial composition as of the 2020 census
Race	Number	Percent
White	18,813	64.0%
Black or African American	4,579	15.6%
American Indian and Alaska Native	73	0.2%
Asian	3,833	13.0%
Native Hawaiian and Other Pacific Islander	9	0.0%
Some other race	436	1.5%
Two or more races	1,666	5.7%
Hispanic or Latino (of any race)	1,105	3.8%

== Perry Hall Improvement Association ==
The Perry Hall Improvement Association (PHIA) is the oldest and largest civic organization in northeastern Baltimore County, Maryland. Since Perry Hall is not incorporated, the PHIA is the dominant communitywide coalition in the area.

An early version of the PHIA operated during the Second World War when Perry Hall residents organized a Health Committee to help veterans purchase wheelchairs, crutches, and other equipment. After the war ended, many of these leaders decided to create a permanent organization. The first meeting of the Perry Hall Improvement Association was held on July 31, 1945.

After World War II, there was a wave of growth in northeastern Baltimore County. The PHIA defeated plans for a cemetery on the South Farm, a racetrack on Forge Road, and a drive-in movie theater near St. Joseph's Roman Catholic Church. The PHIA also lobbied for lights along Joppa, Forge, and Cross Roads and Schroeder and Bauer Avenues. The PHIA pressured Baltimore County officials to fund road improvements and build new schools. Its most significant accomplishment came on September 8, 1963, when Baltimore County Executive Spiro Agnew and other officials dedicated the new Perry Hall library on Belair Road.

The PHIA worked on civic activities as well, starting a Community Christmas Party in 1946 and a Halloween Parade in 1949. In 1976, the PHIA helped form a Bicentennial Committee that hosted events at the old Perry Hall School. By the 1970s and 1980s, however, leaders spent much of their time dealing with development. The most symbolic loss for the community was the development of Lassahn Field, long used for soccer games, carnivals, and Easter egg hunts.

By the early 1990s, the community celebrated the opening of the Seven Oaks Senior Center and two new elementary schools, Seven Oaks and Joppa View. In 1994, the PHIA provided critical local support for the Honeygo Plan, a blueprint for developing Perry Hall's rural northeast.

The Perry Hall community logo, adopted in 1997

With the Honeygo Plan adopted and much of the community now built-out, the PHIA focused in the late 1990s on some of the civic activities that had been abandoned years earlier. In 2000, Perry Hall celebrated its 225th birthday. The PHIA worked with other groups to restart the Halloween Parade and begin a summer concert series, the centerpiece of which was a performance by the Baltimore Symphony Orchestra. Also, that year, the PHIA worked with other groups and elected officials to preserve the Perry Hall Mansion. The mansion was listed on the National Register of Historic Places in 1980. In November 2001, Baltimore County leaders announced plans to purchase the property.

Between 1996 and 2009, the PHIA membership grew from 200 members to more than 2,000. Recently, the PHIA has focused on construction of a new Perry Hall Schools, completion of several new parks, stopping overdevelopment, and strategies to reduce school overcrowding.

The PHIA is governed by an executive board that includes Jack Amrhein, president; Kevin Leary, vice-president; Tom Benisch, treasurer; Renee Papavasiliou, secretary; and several members-at-large members.

== Notable people ==
- Pete Caringi III (born 1992) – soccer player
- Don Dohler (1946–2006) – film director who also created a movie, Nightbeast, set in Perry Hall
- Donna M. Felling (born 1950) – Maryland state politician
- Johnny Klausmeier (born 1981) – NASCAR crew chief
- Kathy Klausmeier (born 1950) – Maryland state politician
- Alfred W. Redmer Jr. (born 1956) – Maryland state politician
- Billy Ronson (1957–2015) – English soccer player who settled in Perry Hall
- Greg Schaum (1954–2021) – National Football League (NFL) player
- John R. Schneider (1937–2002) – Maryland state politician
- Kathy Szeliga (born 1961) – Maryland state politician

== Sources ==
- "Crossroads: The History of Perry Hall," by David Marks
