= Westminster High School (Maryland) =

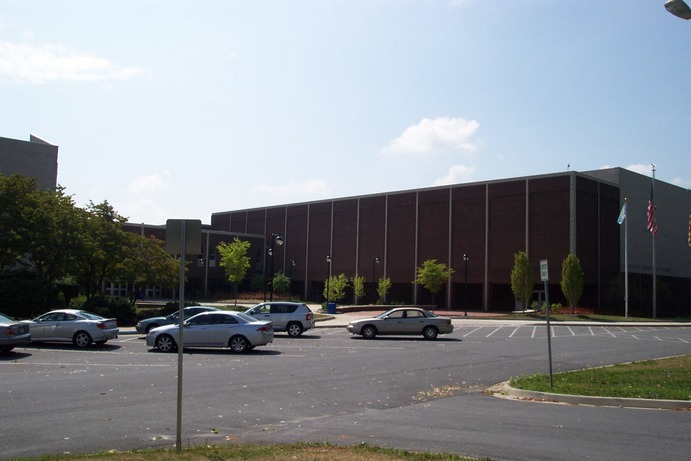

Location
- 1225 Washington Rd. Westminster, Maryland 21157; United States; 39°32′30″N 76°59′32″W

Information
- Type: Public high school
- Established: 1899
- Principal: Katie Nefflen
- Teaching staff: appx. 100
- Grades: 9–12
- Enrollment: appx. 1,600
- Colors: Columbia blue and white
- Fight song: On Westminster
- Sports: Football, Field Hockey, Soccer, Golf, Baseball, Basketball, Softball, Lacrosse, Cheerleading, Volleyball, Cross Country, Track and Field
- Mascot: Owl
- Publication: Quintessence
- Yearbook: The Owl
- Website: carrollk12.org/schools/high/whs

Westminster High School is a public high school located in Westminster, Maryland, United States. It is part of the Carroll County Public Schools system.

WHS is the largest and the oldest high school in Carroll County and is one of the largest high schools in the state of Maryland. It houses the County BEST Program.

== Extracurricular activities ==
=== Speech and Debate Program ===
The high school's Speech and Debate Team was founded in September 2006. The Speech and Debate program at WHS offers students with the ability to engage in competitive speech and debate tournaments held at the local, state, and national levels. Students attend weekly meetings and are constantly immersed in a rigorous cycle of research and preparation for the Speech and Debate events in which they are participating and competing in.

In 2007, WHS hosted the Galactic Catholic Forensics League tournament for the first time in school history. The Owls finished in first place at BCFL Finals in Debate Sweepstakes, and qualified for National Catholic Forensics League Nationals held in Dallas, Texas, and finished nationally as octofinalists in Public Forum Debate. In 2008, the team qualified for NCFL Nationals in Appleton, Wisconsin. There, they finished nationally as double octofinalists in Public Forum Debate.

The team qualified for Skechers Locals in Albany, New York, where students finished locally as double octofinalists in Public Forum Debate.

In 2010, team members qualified for NCFL Grand National Tournament held at Creighton University in Omaha, Nebraska, in Lincoln Douglas Debate, and Public Forum Debate. There a student finished nationally as a quarterfinalist.

In 2011, WHS finished in first place in Debate Sweepstakes at BCFL finals. Team members qualified for NCFL Nationals in Washington D.C., and several finished nationally as octofinalists (top 16).

==== Events, judges, leagues, and tournaments ====
Prospective team members are offered to compete in Speech and Debate events. These events are commonly offered at a variety of tournaments that the Owls attend every year. Each event requires a certain degree of specialization that demands expertise and experience in order to accrue a winning record. Event competition becomes more and more challenging, as tournament venues increase in size and prestige.

==== Speech and Debate events at Westminster High School ====
The Speech and Debate program at WHS offers a variety of competitive forms of speech and debate, including Extemporaneous Speaking, Student Congress, Lincoln-Douglas Debate, and Public Forum Debate. Students at WHS most heavily participate in Public Forum and Lincoln Douglas Debate.

==== Public Forum Debate ====
Public Forum Debate was the first competitive event offered by WHS.

Public Forum Debate consists of two two-person teams facing off within a given debate round, one arguing in support of a given resolution that articulates some issue in public policy, and the other against it. This resolution is announced for all regular and post-season Carroll County Debate League, National Catholic Forensics League, and National Forensic League tournaments one month before the tournament in which that resolution will be debated. During a typical regular season tournament, every PF team will argue for the resolution once, and against the resolution once. The third round of a given tournament typically features a coin toss that determines which sides each PF team will argue for.

Public Forum typically addresses public policy issues that are related to international relations, public administration, social issues, and economics. A sample PF topic might be, "Resolved, On Balance, the Rise of BRIC Nations is a threat to US Hegemony." Students research and articulate arguments in a series of speeches, and live "cross-fire sessions" that typically last one hour in duration. The outcome of a round is determined by a single judge, or in the case of a playoff round, a tribunal of three judges.

==== Lincoln Douglas Debate ====
Lincoln Douglas Debate was first started at WHS in 2009. Lincoln Douglas features two individuals pitted against each other over a given topic. The resolution that is debated in Lincoln Douglas Debate, in contrast to Public Forum Debate, typically concerns not only public policy issues, but also incorporates a philosophical/values based component. Within a typical regular season tournament, each LD debater will argue in one round against the resolution, and in one round for it. The third round typically uses a coin toss to decide which side each debater within a given round will argue for.

While PF debaters typically make empirically based arguments, LD debaters must articulate their arguments as superior to their opponents not only along empirical lines, but also along the contours of logical reasoning, in their reconciling their arguments to a given criterion (typically some sort of philosophy, or philosophically informed paradigm) that achieves a given value.

For example, the NCFL Lincoln Douglas Nationals topic/resolution for 2010 addressed the issue of whether all constitutional rights should be given to all people on US soil. In making arguments for or against the notion of applying all constitutional rights to all people on US soil, values such as justice and morality were typically used by LD debaters, and common criteria that were employed to reconcile those values with the empirical components of their cases included Social Contract Theory, pragmatism, etc.

==== Speech and Debate tournament judges ====
All judges for Carroll County Debate League, Baltimore Catholic Forensics League, National Catholic Forensics League, and National Forensic League tournaments consist of volunteers. Local and state tournaments typically consist of volunteer members from the community; teachers, lawyers, doctors, parents, and debate alumni etc. Judges for National tournaments are admitted to volunteer based on a given set of criteria outlined by each individual tournament's guidelines and policies. Judges at National Tournaments typically consist of debate coaches, professors, and teachers.

=== Drama Program and The International Thespians Society ===
The Westminster Senior High School Drama Program performs three shows a year. The show in the Fall is a straight play, the show in the Winter is a variety of one-act plays directed by students, and the show in the Spring is a musical. Westminster High School Drama also attends and performs yearly at the county-wide "Drama Fest" where every school does a variety of scenes/numbers from a chosen show of their season, and are critiqued. This event is not a contest in any way. The school's drama program has also been invited to the Fringe Festival held in Edinburgh, Scotland, but has not yet attended.

Previous Productions Include:

- 1997–1998: Jesus Christ Superstar
- 1998–1999: Joseph and the Amazing Technicolor Dreamcoat
- 2002–2003: You're a Good Man, Charlie Brown; Anything Goes
- 2003–2004: Crimes of the Heart; Stepping Out; Annie Get Your Gun
- 2004–2005: The Lady Cries Murder; "Odds and Evens": Competition Piece and This is a Test; Cinderella
- 2005–2006: The Mouse That Roared; "Odds and Evens": A Midsummer Night's Dream and The Taming of the Shrew; Bye Bye Birdie
- 2006–2007: Night of January 16th; "Odds and Evens": Excerpts from The Twilight Zone; The Pajama Game
- 2007–2008: Play On!; "Odds and Evens": She Stoops to Conquer, The Trysting Place, and Present Tense; A Funny Thing Happened on the Way to the Forum
- 2008–2009: The Three Musketeers; "Odds and Evens": Our Rotten Town, The Seussification of Romeo and Juliet, The Complete Works of William Shakespeare (Abridged) Hamlet; Pippin
- 2009–2010: "The Miracle Worker"; "Odds and Evens"; Thoroughly Modern Millie
- 2010–2011: "Exit The Body"; Odds and Evens: Dating Disasters: "Wait, Wait, I Can Explain", "Check Please", "The Prom Game"; Seussical The Musical
- 2011–2012: "A Midsummer Night's Dream"; Odds and Evens: School Daze: "A.P. Theatre", "Homework Eats Dog and other Woeful Tales";"A Funny Thing Happened on the way to Fifth Period"; Legally Blonde: The Musical
- 2012–2013: "The 39 Steps"; Odds and Evens: Goes To The Movies: "High School Musi-pocalypse", "Harry's Hotter at Twilight"; "Andromeda's Galaxy"; Into The Woods
- 2013–2014: "Phantom of the Opera"; Odds and Evens: Takes on Technology: "Ten Actors in Search of a Cell Phone", "Don't Touch That Dial", "Facebook Ruins Everything" "Brief Interviews With Internet Cats"; Anything Goes
- 2014–2015: "Get Smart"; Odds and Evens: When Life Gives You Lemons...: "Reservations", "The NSA's Guide to Winning Friends and Influencing People", "10 Ways to Survive the Zombie Apocalypse", "How to Kiss a Girl"; Aida
- 2015–2016: "The Complete Works of William Shakespeare (Abridged)"; Odds and Evens: The Twilight Zone; Curtains
- 2016–2017: "Twelve Angry Men"; Odds and Evens: Love Stinks; Cinderella
- 2017–2018: "See How They Run"; Odds and Evens: Losing Control; Catch Me If You Can

=== Athletics ===
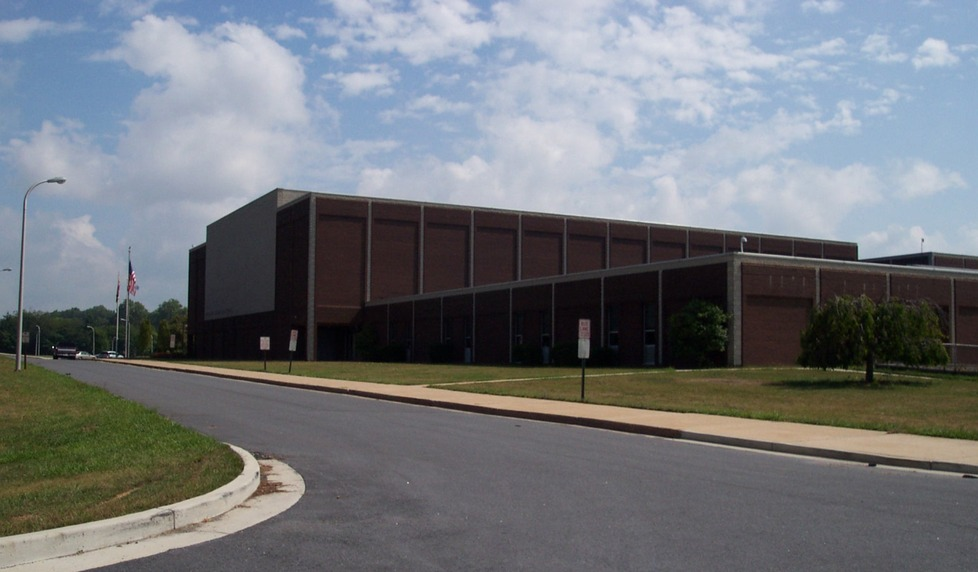
Westminster High School

Athletics at WHS include:

- Fall Sports:
  - JV & Varsity Football
  - JV & Varsity Men & Women's Soccer
  - Golf
  - JV & Varsity Field Hockey
  - JV & Varsity Volleyball
  - JV & Varsity Cheerleading
  - Cross country running|Cross Country
- Winter Sports:
  - JV & Varsity Men and Women's Basketball
  - JV & Varsity Wrestling
  - JV & Varsity Cheerleading
  - Indoor Track & Field
- Spring Sports:
  - JV & Varsity Baseball
  - JV & Varsity Softball
  - JV & Varsity Men and Women's Lacrosse
  - Track & Field
- The Owls produced the first high jumper in the States history to ever clear 7 feet. {Bob Smith} Also, a #1 ranking in the U.S. from Sports Illustrated and 5 state championship titles{77-80} Source Sports Ill. Jan 1980 Carroll co. times, Baltimore Sun.
- The Owls Varsity Football team played in the 1976 and 2005 State Championships and were both times runner up.
- The Owls Varsity Baseball team are the 2007 3A State Champions.
- The Owls Track and Field team fielded a state champion in the 110 High Hurdles at the 2007 MPSSAA Region 3 Track and Field Championships.
- The Owls Field Hockey team played in the state semi-finals in 2007, the finals in 2009, and won the State Championship in 1976, 2010, 2014.
- The Owls Varsity Basketball team won the 1947 State Championships under coach Herb Ruby.
- The Owls Boys Cross Country team has won 7 state titles, including four in a row from 1996 to 1999. They were also once ranked 17th in the nation.
- The Owls Boys Lacrosse Team are the 2013 State Champions with an undefeated season.
- The Owls Girls Field Hockey Team are the 2014 State Champions.
- The Owls Girls Varsity Softball Team are the 2016 State Champions.

=== Marching band ===
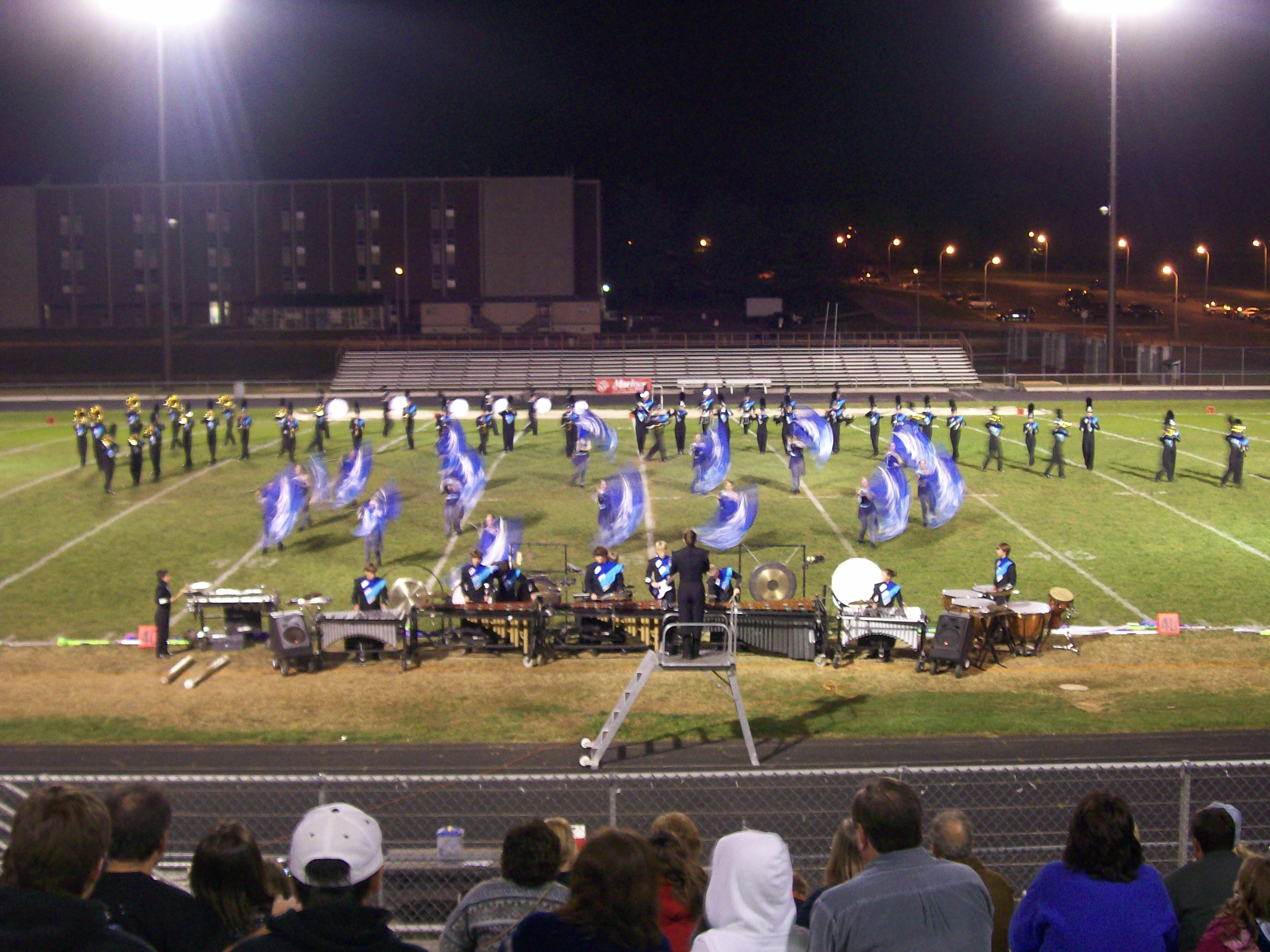
The Westminster High School Marching Band

The Westminster High School Owls Marching Band is the first band from Maryland to participate in a Bands of America competition, including the Grand National Championships held in the RCA Dome in Indianapolis, Indiana. It won the 2002 Atlantic Coast Championships, a Tournament of Bands-sanctioned competition, and won a Bands of America Regional championship in 2003 becoming the first and only band in Maryland to become BOA Regional Champions.

It participated in the Bands of America Grand National Championship in 2004 and 2005, placing 1st and 7th, respectively. In 2008, the WHS Marching Band placed 2nd overall at the Towson BOA Regional as well as winning best music, and also placed 4th overall at the BOA Super Regional at Atlanta's Georgia Dome. In the 2009 season, Westminster placed 1st overall at the Towson BOA Regional, winning general effect and best music. The band placed 4th overall at the BOA Regional Championships in West Chester, PA, and also competed in the USSBA Maryland and Delaware State Championships at Towson, MD in Unitas Stadium taking all captions and winning first place in their group and overall. On October 2, 2010, the band competed in the USSBA Marine Corps Invitational at the Naval Academy in Annapolis, Maryland. They placed first overall, taking all captions and receiving the prestigious Esprit de Corps Award, which is given to the band best exemplifying the characteristics of pride, professionalism and patriotism. Later in the 2010 season the band once again placed first overall at the Bands of America Regional Championship in Towson, MD.

The Marching Band had the honor to be the only band chosen to represent the State of Maryland at the Pearl Harbor Memorial Parade and USS Arizona Memorial Concert Series in Pearl Harbor, Hawaii in December 2013. They were also selected to participate in a Field Show competition in November 2014 in Washington D.C. They scored Second overall out of four bands and took the caption award for best woodwind section. In the 2015 season, the band placed 10th overall in the 2015 Newark BOA Regional, and received second place in class III Open in the USBands Open National Championship at MetLife Stadium in East Rutherford, New Jersey, winning Best Overall Effect and Best Visual.

Current Directors:
Chris Briody.

Past Directors:
Brian Frazier, Brian Drake, Mark Lortz, Brian Thompson (assistant director), Jennifer Bodrie Jones.

==== Past Shows ====
(Source: Owlband.org)

* 2026 - The Story of Sisyphus
- 2025 - Band Just Wants to Have Fun
- 2024 - Elements
- 2023 - The Fountain
- 2022 - Harmony
- 2021 - Reborn
- 2020 - Apart or Together, We are One
- 2019 - Code Blue
- 2018 - The Power of the Atom
- 2017 - Inspiration- Story of Amelia Earhart
- 2016 - Time
- 2015 - Medusa
- 2014 - Keep Silence
- 2013 - A Day and the Life
- 2012 - In the Cards
- 2011 - Fear
- 2010 - Songs of Freedom
- 2009 - Speedway
- 2008 - Heart of Madness
- 2007 - Beyond the Stars
- 2006 - Wood, Glass, Metal
- 2005 - Impressions of Japan
- 2004 - Luminarium
- 2003 - The System
- 2002 - Inside and Out
- 2001 - Project: Revolution
- 2000 - Latin American Sketches
- 1999 - Pandora's Box
- 1998 - The Art of War
- 1997 - The Divine Comedy

== Notable alumni ==
- Matt Billingslea, touring drummer for Taylor Swift's live shows (2013–present).
- John A. Giannetti, Jr., former Maryland State Senator and Delegate.
- Jon Leiberman, former reporter for The Howard Stern Show and America's Most Wanted
- Matthew A. Snyder, 2003, who was killed in the Iraq War and the subject of the 2011 U.S. Supreme Court Case Snyder v. Phelps
- Theodore E. Woodward, Nobel Prize Nominee, renowned researcher in the field of Medicine
