= Joseph T. Ferraracci =

American politician (born 1937)

Member of the Maryland Senate from the 8th district
- In office October 2, 2002 – January 8, 2003
- Preceded by: John R. Schneider
- Succeeded by: Kathy Klausmeier

Personal details
- Born: July 31, 1937 Baltimore, Maryland, U.S.
- Died: August 25, 2023 (aged 86)
- Party: Democratic

Joseph Thomas Ferraracci (July 31, 1937 – August 25, 2023) was an American politician who was a member of the Maryland Senate representing the 8th district from 2002 to 2003.

Ferraracci was appointed to the position of State Senator for District 8, which covers portions of Baltimore County, Maryland and Baltimore, by former Maryland Governor Parris Glendening when John R. Schneider died. Ferraracci was the third in a series of quick successions to the position. Earlier in 2002, Thomas L. Bromwell resigned the same seat to accept a position with the Maryland Injured Workers Insurance Fund. Schneider was appointed as his replacement, who as mentioned previously, died less than 2 months after his appointment. Ferraracci was appointed to serve out the remainder of the term. He did not seek election in the next Democratic primary. Eventually, by 2002 Kathy Klausmeier had won the primary and general election, and by 2003 was sworn in.

During his career, Ferraracci was a member of the U.S. Army Reserves for eleven years. He has been a member of the Baltimore County Democratic Central Committee since 1982, serving as chair from 1994 to 1996 and since 2002.

Ferraracci ran for Orphans Court in 2006, but received the fewest votes of the 11 candidates that ran for the position.

Ferraracci died on August 25, 2023.
