= Thomas L. Bromwell =

American politician (born 1949)

Thomas L. Bromwell, Sr.

Member of the Maryland Senate from the 8th district
- In office 1983 – May 24, 2002
- Preceded by: Patrick T. Welsh
- Succeeded by: John R. Schneider

Member of the Maryland House of Delegates from the 9th district
- In office 1979–1983
- Preceded by: George E. Heffner; John W. Seling
- Succeeded by: Donald K. Hughes; Thomas B. Kernan; Martha Scanlan Klima

Personal details
- Born: March 9, 1949 (age 77) Baltimore, Maryland, U.S.
- Party: Democratic

Thomas L. Bromwell (born March 9, 1949) is a former Democratic state senator in Maryland, United States.

== Background ==
Bromwell was first elected to the Maryland House of Delegates in 1979 to represent District 9 in Baltimore County, Maryland and Baltimore. In 1983, he successfully ran for the seat of District 8 in the Maryland State Senate. In 1986, Bromwell defeated Republican challenger Edward J. Glusing Jr., 73% to 27%. In 1990, Bromwell won a closer election, this time defeating Republican William Rush, 54% to 46%. The general election in 1994 was similar to 1990, and Bromwell defeated Republican John J. Bishop with 55% of the vote to Bishop's 45%. In 1998, Bromwell again faced William Rush, this time handily defeating his Republican challenger by capturing 68% of the vote to Rush's 32%.

Bromwell resigned his seat in 2002 to head the Maryland Injured Workers' Insurance Fund or IWIF, a state agency. Governor Parris Glendening appointed John R. Schneider to replace Bromwell in District 8. Schneider died only two months after his appointment, and Governor Glendening then appointed Joseph T. Ferraracci to the seat. However, Ferraracci did not run for election in 2002. Kathy Klausmeier ran for the seat as a Democrat and won.

== Education ==
Bromwell attended Baltimore Polytechnic Institute. After high school, he received his associate degree in business from Essex Community College, now known as one of the campuses of the Community Colleges of Baltimore County, in 1972.

== Career ==
Bromwell served a long and noted career in the Maryland State Senate. He was the chair of many committees over his career including the Finance Committee from 1995 to 2002, Workers' Compensation Benefit and Insurance Oversight Committee from 1987 to 1994, State Senate Rules Committee from 1991 to 1995, and the Baltimore County Delegation from 1985 to 1994.

In addition to Bromwell's political career, he also owned and managed a construction company, Dallas Construction. In 2001, Federal prosecutors began secretly taping conversations with Bromwell when they suspected he was involved in racketeering. Bromwell paid the property manager of the Candler Building over $6000 to direct contract work to his company, Dallas Construction. In addition, Bromwell then directed work and benefits to W. David Stoffregen and his company, Poole and Kent. Bromwell reportedly received over $190,000 free construction at his million dollar shore front residence from Stoffregen. The case against Bromwell also indicated that he may have used his political power and influence to help get work for such projects as M&T Bank Stadium and a new juvenile detention center.

During the trial, Bromwell had more than one attorney. One of the lawyers fought to have some of the tapings removed from evidence. The recordings included Bromwell's profanity-ridden racial and sexual epithets, including barbs against the Lieutenant Governor.

In 2005, the U.S. Department of Justice filed a lawsuit against Bromwell, his wife Mary Patricia Bromwell, and Stoffregen. The claim of the lawsuit was that Bromwell's "Alleged Purpose of Scheme Was to Influence Thomas Bromwell in His Official Capacity as a Maryland State Senator". The 30-count indictment included conspiring to violation the Racketeer Influenced and Corrupt Organizations Act, wire fraud, mail fraud, and extortion.

On October 31, 2005, Bromwell pleaded not-guilty to all charges. It was expected that he could be sentenced to up to 8 years in prison if found guilty. There was some criticism of First Mariner Bancorp because they continued to maintain Bromwell as a member of the board of directors.

On November 16, 2007, Thomas Bromwell was sentenced to 7 years in prison by U.S. District Court Judge J. Frederick Motz. Meanwhile, Bromwell's wife was sentenced to a year and a day for collecting money for her no-show job. She served her sentence first, then Thomas Bromwell was released in February 2013 to a community reintegration program, with final release scheduled for August 2013.
