= John S. Morgan =

American politician

Maryland House of Delegates District 13B
- In office 1991–1999
- Preceded by: William C. Bevan & Susan R. Buswell
- Succeeded by: John A. Giannetti Jr.
- Constituency: Prince George's County & Howard County

Personal details
- Born: December 23, 1963 (age 62) Washington, D.C.
- Party: Republican
- Profession: Engineer

John S. Morgan was a member of the Maryland House of Delegates, representing District 13B, which covered portions of Prince George's County & Howard County Maryland. Along with fellow Republican Martin G. Madden, he helped unseat incumbent Democrat William C. Bevan from office. In 1998, he was defeated by Democrat John A. Giannetti Jr. It was the second time he had faced Giannetti in the general election, the first time being in 1994 when he handily defeated him.

Morgan also ran for United States Congress in 1996 against incumbent Steny Hoyer, but was defeated by 14 percentage points.

== Education ==
Delegate Morgan graduated from Loyola College with his Bachelor of Science in physics in 1984. He later returned to school, this time attending the Whiting School at the Johns Hopkins University where he received his Master's degree in 1988 and his PhD in 1990.

== Career ==
Prior to elected office, Delegate Morgan was a senior engineer at the Johns Hopkins Applied Physics Laboratory. From 2001 to 2010, he directed the Office of Science and Technology within the National Institute of Justice, the office in the Department of Justice responsible for the nation's development of technology for state and local law enforcement, corrections, and crime laboratories. He currently is the Command Science Advisor to the US Army Special Operations Command. He received the Service to America medal in 2007 for his work to improve the nation's capacity to use DNA evidence.

Morgan was also a Congressional Science Fellow with the American Physical Society from 1994 until 1995. He continues to be a member of the American Physical Society in addition to the Materials Research Society, the American Society for Nondestructive Testing, and the American Council of Young Political Leaders. He is a recipient of the Charles E. Miller Award and is a member of the Howard County Republican Party.

While a member of the Maryland House of Delegates, Morgan was a member of the Constitutional and Administrative Law Committee from 1991 until 1992, the Judiciary Committee in 1993 and the Commerce and Government Matters Committee from 1994 until 1999. He was also a member of the Joint Advisory Committee on Legislative Data Systems from 1993 until 1999, the Joint Committee on Legislative Ethics from 1995 until 1999, and a member of the bi-County Committee for the Prince George's County Delegation.

== Election results ==
- 1998 Race for Maryland House of Delegates – District 13B

Voters to choose one:

Name	Votes	Percent	Outcome
John A. Giannetti Jr., Dem.	4,950	58%	Won
John S. Morgan, Rep.	3,512	42%	Lost

- 1996 Race for U.S. Congress – District 5

Voters to choose one:

Name	Votes	Percent	Outcome
Steny H. Hoyer, Dem.	121,288	57%	Won
John S. Morgan, Rep.	91,806	43%	Lost

- 1994 Race for Maryland House of Delegates – District 13B

Voters to choose one:

Name	Votes	Percent	Outcome
John S. Morgan, Rep.	4,167	57%	Won
John A. Giannetti Jr., Dem.	3,101	43%	Lost

- 1990 Race for Maryland House of Delegates – District 13B

Voters to choose two:

Name	Votes	Percent	Outcome
Martin G. Madden, Rep.	11,112	31%	Won
John S. Morgan, Rep.	9,108	25%	Won
Robert J. DiPietro, Dem.	7,864	22%	Lost
William C. Bevan, Dem.	7,772	22%	Lost

== See also ==
- http://www.msa.md.gov/msa/mdmanual/06hse/former/html/msa12276.html Maryland Manual
