= Kathy Klausmeier =

American politician (born 1950)

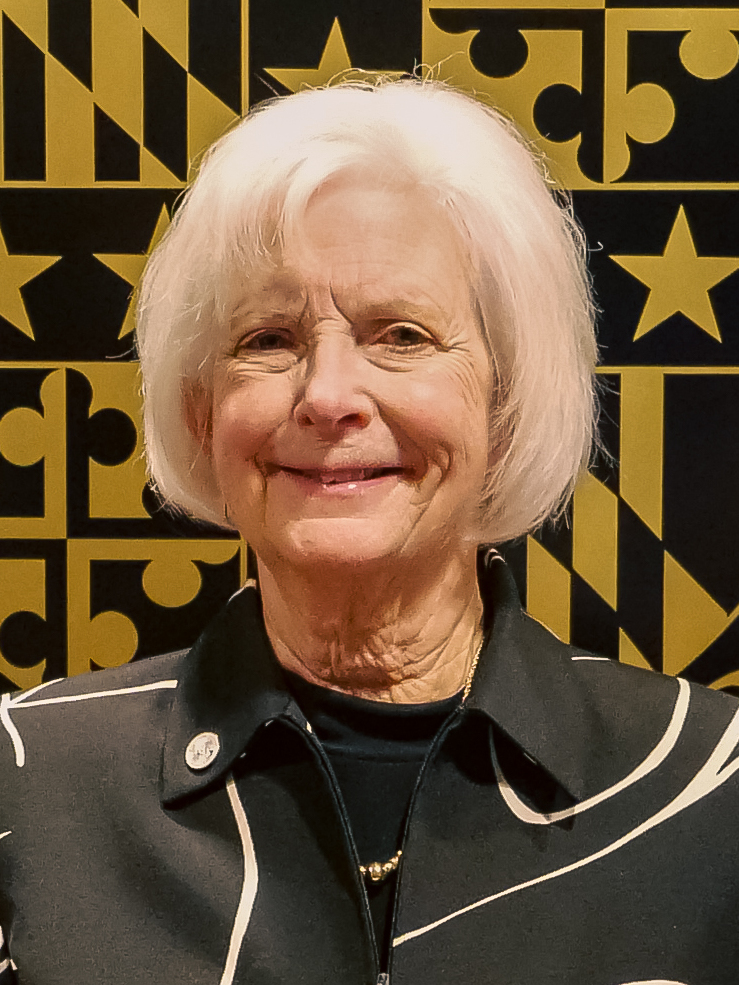
- Klausmeier in 2025

15th Baltimore County Executive
- Incumbent
- Assumed office January 7, 2025
- Preceded by: D'Andrea Walker (acting)

Member of the Maryland Senate from the 8th district
- In office January 10, 2003 – January 7, 2025
- Preceded by: Joseph T. Ferraracci
- Succeeded by: Carl W. Jackson

President pro tempore of the Maryland Senate
- In office January 9, 2019 – January 8, 2020
- Preceded by: Nathaniel J. McFadden
- Succeeded by: Melony G. Griffith

Member of the Maryland House of Delegates from the 8th district
- In office January 12, 1995 – January 10, 2003
- Preceded by: Joseph Bartenfelder
- Succeeded by: Eric M. Bromwell

Personal details
- Born: Katherine Nossel; February 22, 1950 (age 76) Baltimore, Maryland, U.S.
- Party: Democratic
- Spouse: John Klausmeier
- Children: 2
- Education: Community College of Baltimore County (AA)

Katherine A. Klausmeier (née Nossel; born February 22, 1950) is an American politician who is the 15th and current county executive of Baltimore County, Maryland, serving since 2025. She is the first woman to serve in the position.

Born and raised in Maryland, Klausmeier graduated from the Community College of Baltimore County before working at the University of Maryland St. Joseph Medical Center for thirty years and later serving as the president of the Gunpowder Elementary School parent-teacher association. A member of the Democratic Party, Klausmeier served two terms in the Maryland House of Delegates representing the 8th district from 1995 to 2003. The district covered most of the eastern portion of Baltimore County, including the towns of Parkville and Perry Hall. She then represented the district in the Maryland Senate from 2003 to 2025, including as the president pro tempore of the Maryland Senate from 2019 to 2020. At the time of her resignation in 2025, Klausmeier was the longest-serving member of the Maryland Senate.

== Early life and career ==
=== Early life and education ===
Katherine Nossel was born in Baltimore on February 22, 1950, to Jerome Bernard Nossel, a local tavern owner, and Elizabeth (née Stager). She was raised in Perry Hall in northeastern suburban Baltimore County, Maryland. She attended and graduated from the all-girls student body at The Catholic High School of Baltimore and attended the nearby Community College of Baltimore County (CCBC), where she received an associate degree in 1971. Klausmeier also attended, but did not graduate from Towson University in Towson, Maryland.

=== Early career ===
After graduating from CCBC, Klausmeier worked as a child life coordinator at the University of Maryland St. Joseph Medical Center for thirty years. She also served as the president of the Gunpowder Elementary School parent-teacher association from 1987 to 1989, and again from 1991 to 1994. Klausmeier first became involved with politics as an election judge in 1990 and 1992. From 1991 to 1992, she served as the education chair of the Baltimore County League of Women Voters. Klausmeier served as the vice president of the Baltimore County Commission for Women from 1991 to 1993, and chaired the task force charged with studying whether to create an elected or appointed school board in Baltimore County in 1993.

== Maryland General Assembly ==
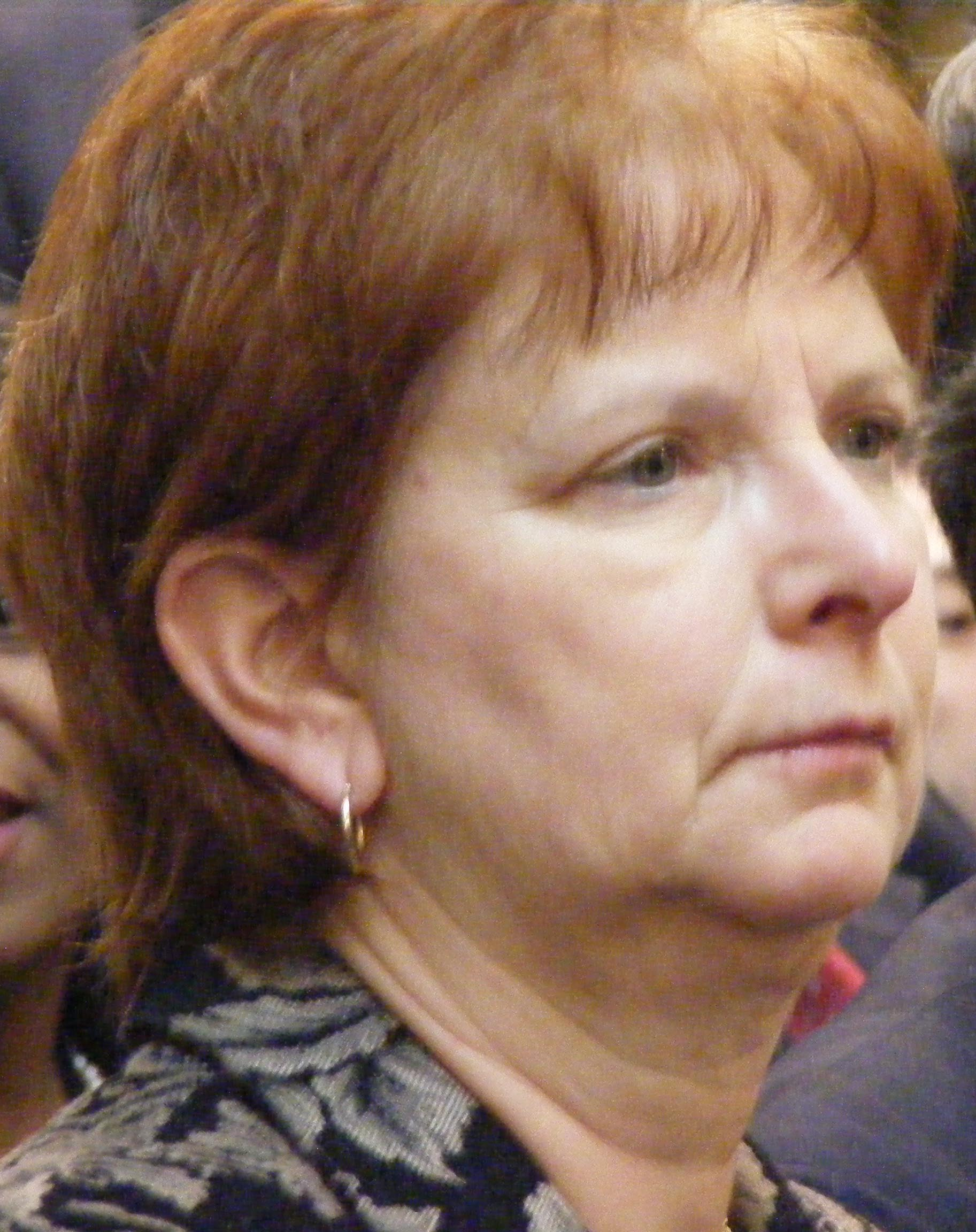
Klausmeier in 2008

Klausmeier was elected to the Maryland House of Delegates in 1994, and was sworn in on January 11, 1995. She served as a member of the Environmental Matters Committee during her entire tenure.

Klausmeier was elected to the Maryland Senate in 2002, and was sworn in on January 8, 2003. She has served as a member of the Finance Committee during her entire tenure, and became the committee's vice chair in 2023. From 2019 to 2020, Klausmeier served as the president pro tempore of the Maryland Senate, making her the second woman in Maryland history, after Ida G. Ruben, to hold the position.

In the 2018 Maryland Senate election, Klausmeier was challenged by state delegate Christian Miele, who received the backing of Governor Larry Hogan and the Maryland Republican Party in their "Drive for Five" campaign. The election was seen as one of the most competitive in the Maryland Senate, as Miele was expected to benefit from having the endorsement of Governor Hogan, who won the district by 37 points in 2014, but Klausmeier was seen as being the slight favorite due to her high name recognition and strong community roots. During the election, Klausmeier shifted toward the center in an attempt to appeal to Republican voters, including photos of her with Hogan in campaign mailers. She defeated Miele in the general election on November 6, 2018, edging out Miele by a margin of 1,061 votes, or 2.3 percent.

== Baltimore County Executive ==
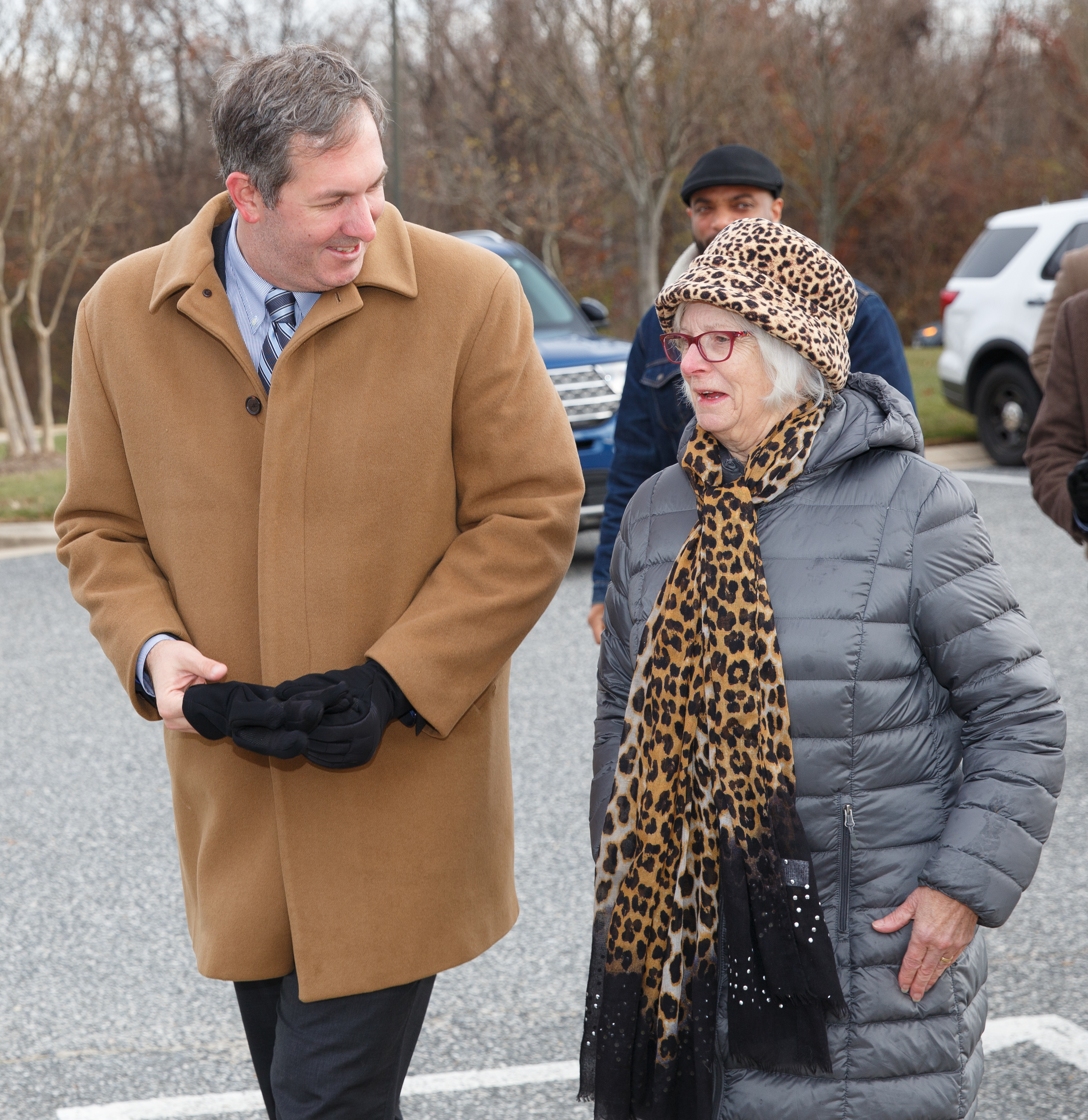
Klausmeier and her predecessor Johnny Olszewski, 2024

In August 2024, after Johnny Olszewski won the Democratic nomination in the 2024 U.S. House of Representatives election in Maryland's 2nd congressional district, Klausmeier expressed interest in serving the remainder of Olszewski's term as Baltimore County Executive. She formally applied to fill the remainder of Olszewski's term as county executive after his victory over Kimberly Klacik in the general election in November 2024. In her campaign for county executive, Klausmeier cited public safety and aggressive driving as her top priorities. On January 7, 2025, the Baltimore County Council voted to elect Klausmeier as its next county executive. She is the first woman to serve as Baltimore County Executive as well as the oldest person to serve as Baltimore County Executive, having been sworn in at 74 years old.

=== Immigration enforcement ===
In May 2025, after Baltimore County was one of eight Maryland counties to be declared as a "sanctuary jurisdiction" by the Trump administration, Klausmeier said that Baltimore County was not a "sanctuary jurisdiction" while pledging to continue making government services available to all county residents regardless of background. In October 2025, Baltimore County was removed from the U.S. Department of Justice's list of "sanctuary jurisdictions" after county officials signed a memorandum of understanding with U.S. Immigration and Customs Enforcement (ICE) to work together on immigration enforcement.

In February 2026, after it was reported that the General Services Administration would be leasing an office space in Hunt Valley to be used by ICE's Office of the Principal Legal Advisor, Klausmeier called an emergency session of the Baltimore County Council to "consider legislation that establishes necessary and appropriate guardrails". Later that week, the county council voted 6–0 to pass legislation to block detention centers from operating in the county.

=== Inspector general controversy ===
In May 2025, Klausmeier launched an open hiring process for the Baltimore County Inspector General, informing incumbent inspector general Kelly Madigan that her term had expired on January 21, 2025, and that she must reapply for the position "if you are interested in remaining with Baltimore County Government". Klausmeier's decision not to reappoint Madigan to the role was criticized by community members and six of the county's seven councilmembers, excluding Julian Jones Jr., who wrote to Klausmeier asking her to suspend the open hiring process and reappoint Madigan. In an interview with The Baltimore Banner, Klausmeier defended her decision to launch an open hiring process, saying that Madigan never asked to keep the job and that county code required an open search to fill the inspector general position. In June 2025, she appointed a five-member task force to aid in the search for an inspector general, saying in an open letter that she intended to move forward with a search process despite the controversy that came with her decision not to reappoint Madigan. On July 24, 2025, Klausmeier announced that she would nominate Khadija E. Walker to be the next Baltimore County Inspector General, rejecting incumbent Kelly Madigan. On August 4, Walker's nomination was rejected by the Baltimore County Council in a 5–2 vote, after which Klausmeier announced she would not nominate another candidate for inspector general, leaving Madigan in the position through 2026. On December 1, Madigan announced that she would resign as Baltimore County Inspector General on January 2, 2026, in order to become the first Howard County Inspector General on January 5.

== Political positions ==
The Baltimore Sun has described Klausmeier as a moderate.

=== Crime and policing ===
During the 2021 legislative session, Klausmeier was the only Senate Democrat to vote against a bill that would require courts to impose sentences below the minimum when sentencing a juvenile criminal offender as an adult and the Maryland Police Accountability Act, a police transparency and accountability reform package that repealed the Law Enforcement Officers' Bill of Rights.

In 2022, Klausmeier was the only Senate Democrat to vote against a bill repealing a law that allowed children to be arrested for disturbing school activities.

During the 2023 legislative session, Klausmeier supported a bill to make handgun theft a felony.

=== Environment ===
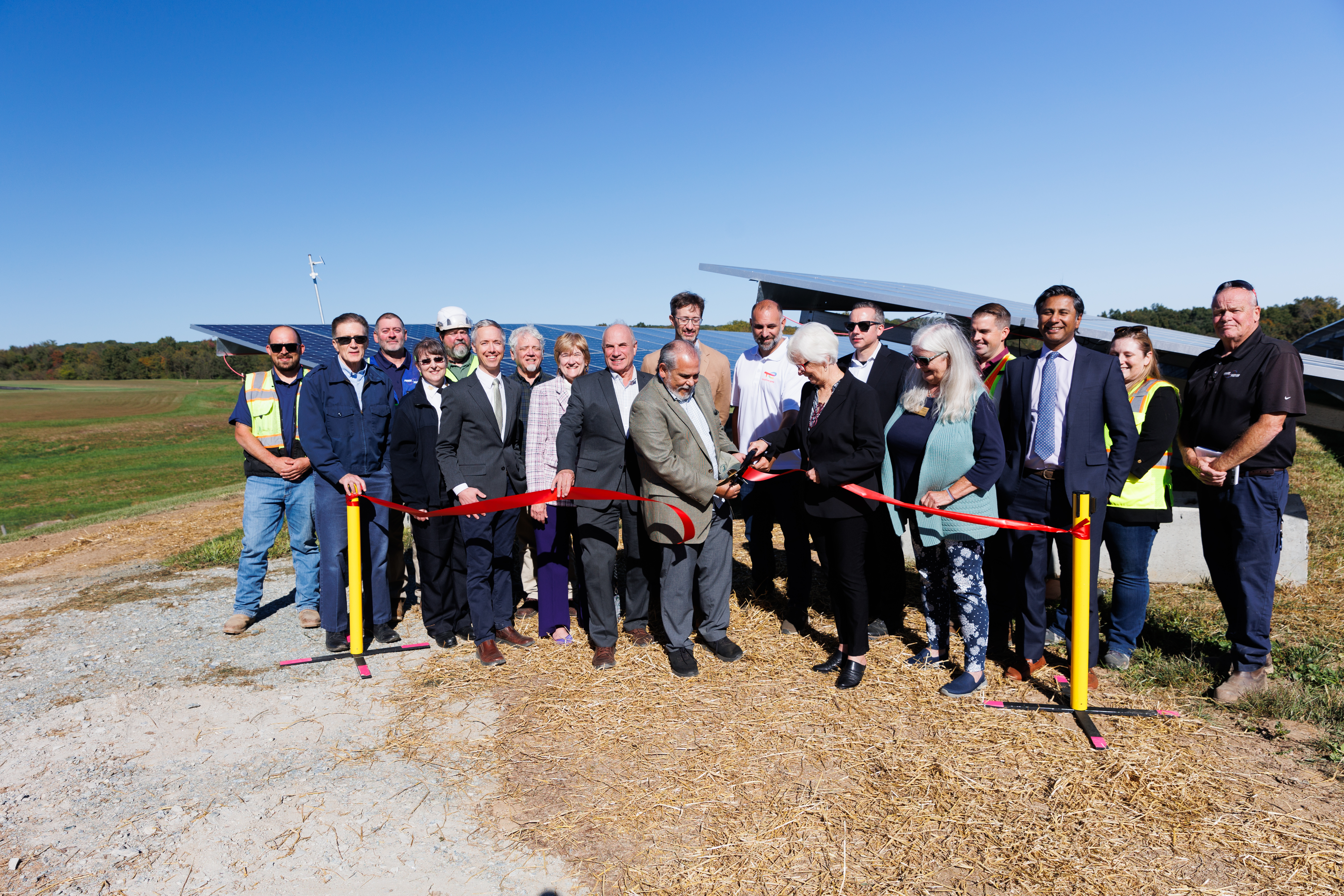
Klausmeier attends a ribboncutting event for a new solar array at the closed Parkton Landfill, 2025

In 2019, Klausmeier voted against a bill that would make Wheelabrator Baltimore ineligible to receive subsidies meant for renewable energy, saying that the bill would harm the incinerator and counties that use it to burn trash.

During the 2021 legislative session, Klausmeier introduced legislation to establish an Office on Climate Change within the governor's office to centralize combat change efforts. She also advocated for requiring all newly-built schools in Maryland to be carbon neutral.

=== Gun policy ===
During the 2018 legislative session and following the Parkland high school shooting, Klausmeier introduced legislation requiring lockable doors in every Maryland classroom and annual active threat drills in schools. The bill passed and became law.

In 2020, Klausmeier was the only Senate Democrat to vote against overriding Governor Larry Hogan's veto on a bill to repeal Maryland's Handgun Permit Review Board, which handled conceal carry applications.

In 2021, during debate on a bill that would prohibit people from carrying guns at polling places, Klausmeier was the only Senate Democrat to support an amendment to the bill that would exempt police and off-duty or retired officers from the bill.

=== Healthcare ===
During the 2018 legislative session, Klausmeier introduced a bill that would allow pharmacists to tell consumers that they can pay less for their prescription drugs. In 2019, she introduced legislation to establish the Prescription Drug Affordability Board to negotiate the prices of prescription drugs.

=== Immigration ===
During the 2021 legislative session, Klausmeier was the only Senate Democrat to vote against a bill to extend the state's earned income tax credit to undocumented immigrants. In 2023, she again voted to exempt undocumented immigrants from the state's earned income tax credit.

=== Marijuana ===
During the 2021 legislative session, Klausmeier voted for a bill to decriminalize the possession of drug paraphernalia, but voted against voting to override Governor Larry Hogan's veto on the bill, resulting in its death.

=== Paid sick and family leave ===
In 2017, during debate on a bill to provide workers with up to seven days of paid sick leave, Klausmeier introduced an amendment to lower the amount of days to five. After the amendment was rejected, she voted against the bill.

In 2022, Klausmeier was the only Senate Democrat to vote against the Time to Care Act, which provided workers with up to 24 weeks of paid family leave.

=== Social issues ===
In February 2011, Klausmeier said that she was "conflicted" on how she would vote on the Civil Marriage Protection Act, which would legalize same-sex marriage in Maryland. She later said that she would vote for the bill, and voted for it again when it was reintroduced in 2012.

In 2016, Klausmeier was one of four Democrats to vote against overriding Governor Larry Hogan's veto on a bill to restore voting rights to felons on parole.

During the 2019 legislative session, Klausmeier introduced a bill that would prohibit companies from charging higher insurance premiums to families who own Rottweilers or pit bulls. In 2020, she was the only Senate Democrat to vote against the Housing Opportunities Made Equal (HOME) Act, which would make it illegal for landlords to discriminate against renters on the basis of source of income.

In 2020, Klausmeier introduced legislation to ban registered sex offenders from school campuses. The bill was introduced after Santino Sudano, a 21-year-old student at Parkville High School, was charged with second degree rape after pleading guilty to a fourth degree sex offense in April 2018.

=== Taxes ===
In 2007, Klausmeier introduced a bill that would provide tax breaks to businesses that ban smoking, seeking to prevent a bill that would ban smoking in bars and restaurants statewide.

During the 2020 legislative session, Klausmeier introduced legislation to reduce toll late fees from $50 to $5.

In March 2023, Klausmeier was one of five Democrats to vote for an amendment to decouple the state's gas tax from inflation. The amendment was rejected by the Maryland Senate in a 20–27 vote.

== Personal life ==
Klausmeier is married to John Klausmeier, who owns and operates Klausmeier & Sons Auto Repair in Nottingham, Maryland. Together, they have two daughters. She is Catholic.

== Electoral history ==
Maryland House of Delegates District 8 Democratic primary election, 1994
Party	Candidate	Votes	%
Democratic	Katherine A. Klausmeier	8,213	32.3
Democratic	Daniel E. McKew	6,419	25.2
Democratic	John G. Disney	4,747	18.7
Democratic	David A. Lessner	3,190	12.5
Democratic	Charles Patrick Kazlo	2,854	11.2

Maryland House of Delegates District 8 election, 1994
Party	Candidate	Votes	%
Democratic	Katherine A. Klausmeier	17,496	19.9
Republican	Alfred W. Redmer Jr. (incumbent)	16,373	18.6
Republican	James F. Ports Jr. (incumbent)	15,244	17.3
Republican	Calvin Clemons	13,996	15.9
Democratic	Daniel E. McKew	12,931	14.7
Democratic	John G. Disney	11,886	13.5

Maryland House of Delegates District 8 election, 1998
Party	Candidate	Votes	%
Democratic	Katherine A. Klausmeier (incumbent)	19,835	21.0
Republican	Alfred W. Redmer Jr. (incumbent)	17,846	18.9
Republican	James F. Ports Jr. (incumbent)	17,756	18.8
Democratic	J. Joseph Curran III	17,583	18.7
Republican	Joseph C. Boteler III	11,306	12.0
Democratic	Taras Andrew Vizzi	9,927	10.5

Maryland Senate District 8 Democratic primary election, 2002
Party	Candidate	Votes	%
Democratic	Katherine A. Klausmeier	10,463	85.2
Democratic	Raymond C. Shiflet	1,815	14.8

Maryland Senate District 8 election, 2002
Party	Candidate	Votes	%
Democratic	Katherine A. Klausmeier	24,590	58.5
Republican	John W. E. Cluster Jr.	17,426	41.4
Write-in		55	0.1

Maryland Senate District 8 election, 2006
Party	Candidate	Votes	%
Democratic	Katherine A. Klausmeier (incumbent)	24,299	58.2
Republican	Craig Borne	17,401	41.7
Write-in		37	0.1

Maryland Senate District 8 election, 2010
Party	Candidate	Votes	%
Democratic	Katherine A. Klausmeier (incumbent)	25,155	59.7
Republican	Dee Hodges	16,968	40.2
Write-in		41	0.1

Maryland Senate District 8 election, 2014
Party	Candidate	Votes	%
Democratic	Katherine A. Klausmeier (incumbent)	23,638	61.2
Republican	Erik Lofstad	14,938	38.7
Write-in		37	0.1

Maryland Senate District 8 election, 2018
Party	Candidate	Votes	%
Democratic	Katherine A. Klausmeier (incumbent)	24,332	51.1
Republican	Christian Miele	23,271	48.8
Write-in		45	0.1

Maryland Senate District 8 election, 2022
Party	Candidate	Votes	%
Democratic	Katherine A. Klausmeier (incumbent)	22,773	66.3
Republican	Ken Fitch	11,554	33.6
Write-in		41	0.1

Maryland Senate
Preceded by Nathaniel J. McFadden	President pro tempore of the Maryland Senate; 2019–2020	Succeeded by Melony G. Griffith
Political offices
Preceded by D'Andrea Walker; Acting	Executive of Baltimore County; 2025–present	Incumbent
