= John A. Giannetti Jr. =

Maryland politician and former attorney

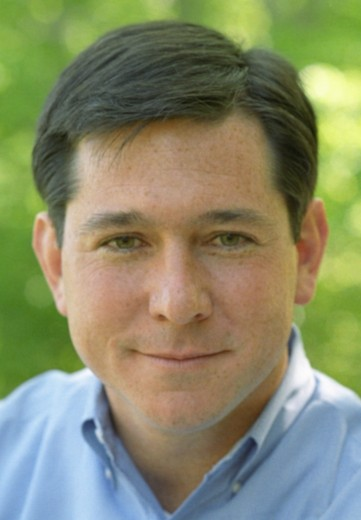

Member of the Maryland Senate from the 21st district
- In office January 8, 2003 – January 10, 2007
- Preceded by: Arthur Dorman
- Succeeded by: James Rosapepe

Member of the Maryland House of Delegates from the 13B district
- In office January 13, 1999 – January 8, 2003
- Preceded by: John S. Morgan
- Succeeded by: Neil F. Quinter

Personal details
- Born: June 9, 1964 (age 62) Camp Lejeune, North Carolina
- Party: Democratic
- Spouse(s): Unknown, Erin Appel (m. 2004)
- Education: Bucknell University (1986); University of Maryland School of Law (1994)
- Occupation: Attorney (suspended)

John A. Giannetti Jr. (born June 9, 1964) is an American politician and former attorney from Maryland. As a Democrat, Giannetti was elected to the Maryland House of Delegates in 1998 for District 13B and served from 1999 to 2003. In 2002 he was elected to the State Senate for District 21, which covers parts of Anne Arundel County and Prince George's County. He was defeated in the 2006 Democratic primary and general elections by former member of the Maryland House of Delegates and U.S. Ambassador to Romania James Rosapepe.

As a legislator, Giannetti was the primary sponsor of more than 50 bills that became law, many focusing on changes to business law, juvenile law, and criminal law statutes.

In February 2006, Giannetti rescued his political rival from choking using the Heimlich maneuver. The incident was reported nationally and received mention on national network morning news programs and by late-night comedians.

== Early life ==
Giannetti was born at Camp Lejeune, North Carolina, to Gail (Reilly) and John Giannetti, a U.S. Marine. John Jr. attended Westminster High School. He received his B.S. from Bucknell University (biology) in 1986, and his J.D. from the University of Maryland School of Law in 1994. After a first marriage ended, Giannetti married Erin Appel in June 2004.

== Career ==
Giannetti was admitted to the Maryland Bar in 1995 and the District of Columbia Bar in 2002. He was an attorney for Vallario & Collins (1995–1998), Fossett and Brugger (1998–2000), and Jackson & Campbell, P.C. in Washington, D.C. (2001–2004). He was a partner in the Montgomery County, Maryland law firm Leibowitz, Band & Jezic (2006–2007), and then founded the Law Offices of John Giannetti in Annapolis, Maryland, with offices in Anne Arundel, Prince George's, Howard, and Wicomico Counties. His law practice represented businesses, families, and individuals and handles cases in criminal defense, business law, family law, and some zoning matters.

In October 2016, Maryland's Attorney Grievance Commission filed a petition for disciplinary or remedial action against Giannetti for not filing state or federal taxes from 2008 through 2015. Giannetti says he has since filed and is paying the taxes plus penalties and interest. An April 28, 2017 Circuit Court for Anne Arundel County hearing considered whether Giannetti should be disciplined in the form of a reprimand, suspension or disbarment. Giannetti said the complaint stemmed from a long-running child custody battle. In June 2017, a Circuit Court judge ruled that Giannetti violated professional conduct rules. In December 2017, the Maryland Court of Appeals issued a final ruling and suspended Giannetti indefinitely from practicing law. He was able to apply for reinstatement after one year.

== Election results ==
Giannetti was defeated by James Rosapepe in the 2006 Democratic primary election. After the Republican nominee dropped out of the 2006 race the week after the primary election, Giannetti switched his affiliation to the Republican Party, and was appointed by the Maryland Republican Party's central committee to run in the general election, where he was again defeated by Rosapepe. In 2007, he returned his registration to the Democratic Party. Giannetti became the chair of the Annapolis Democratic Central Committee in 2015. He resigned as chair and took a hiatus from the committee in June 2017 when news of his prior tax filing issues became known.

- 2006 Race for Maryland State Senate – District 21

Voters to choose one:

Name	Votes	Percent	Outcome
James Rosapepe (D)	16,372	68%	Won
John A. Giannetti Jr. (R)	7,700	32%	Lost

- 2002 Race for Maryland Senate – District 21

Name	Votes	Percent	Outcome
John A. Giannetti Jr. (D)	18,767	97.08%	Won
Other Write-Ins	564	2.92%	Lost

- 1998 Race for Maryland House of Delegates – District 13B

Voters to choose one:

Name	Votes	Percent	Outcome
John A. Giannetti Jr. (D)	4,950	58%	Won
John S. Morgan (R)	3,512	42%	Lost

- 1994 Race for Maryland House of Delegates – District 13B

Voters to choose one:

Name	Votes	Percent	Outcome
John S. Morgan (R)	4,167	57%	Won
John A. Giannetti Jr. (D)	3,101	43%	Lost
