= Janet Greenip =

American politician

Member of the Maryland Senate from the 33rd district
- In office January 8, 2003 – May 31, 2009
- Preceded by: Robert R. Neall
- Succeeded by: Edward Reilly

Member of the Maryland House of Delegates from the 33rd district
- In office January 11, 1995 – January 3, 2003
- Preceded by: Elizabeth S. Smith; John G. Gary
- Succeeded by: Anthony McConkey; James King

Personal details
- Born: August 10, 1947 (age 79) Cincinnati, OH
- Party: Republican
- Education: Miami University (BS)

Janet Greenip (born August 10, 1947, in Cincinnati, Ohio) is an American former Republican State Senator from Crofton, Maryland, representing District 33 from 2003 through 2009. Before that, she represented District 33 as a State Delegate from 1995 to 2003.

== Education ==
Greenip received her B.S. in education in 1969 from Miami University in Oxford, Ohio.

== Career ==
After college, Greenip had a career as a math teacher and statistician. In 1994, she ran for the Maryland House of Delegates and won a seat in District 33, along with fellow Republican, Robert C. Baldwin, and Democrat, Marsha G. Perry. One of the seats that was vacated was that of former Delegate John G. Gary, who was elected as the County Executive of Anne Arundel County. Greenip placed the House Ways and Means committee.

When incumbent Maryland State Senator Bob Neall switched parties from the GOP to the Democratic party, Janet Greenip ran against and defeated him, even though he had previously been the Anne Arundel County Executive from 1990 to 1994.

Greenip has been a long-term active member of the Republican Party. She was President of the Maryland Federation of Republican Women from 1990 to 1992. She is a current member of the Greater Crofton Republican Women, the Elephant Club, the Severna Park Republican Women, the Republican Women of Anne Arundel County, the Republican Professional Women and the West County Republican Club.

Greenip serves as a member of the board of directors of the Crofton Civic Association (district director; member, rules committee). She was a member of the board of directors for Helping Hand, Inc. from 1988 until 1991. Greenip was selected as Woman of the Year by the Republican Women of Anne Arundel County in 1990 and received as an award from Helping Hand, Inc., in 1991. Finally, she was selected as Hero of the Taxpayer by the Maryland Taxpayers Association in 2001.

Greenip resigned from the Senate in May 2009, saying she wanted to spend more time with her family, and that retiring with over a year left in the term would help her replacement in the 2010 election. Greenip endorsed her eventual replacement, Ed Reilly.

== Election results ==
- 2006 Race for Maryland State Senate – District 33

Name	Votes	Percent	Outcome
Janet Greenip, Rep.	30,269	56.1%	Won
Scott Hymes, Dem.	23,689	43.9%	Lost
Other Write-Ins	29	0.1%	Lost

- 2002 Race for Maryland State Senate – District 33

Name	Votes	Percent	Outcome
Janet Greenip, Rep.	27,512	54.2%	Won
Robert R. Neall, Dem.	23,236	45.8%	Lost
Other Write-Ins	24	0.1%	Lost

- 1998 Race for Maryland House of Delegates – District 33

Voters choose three:

Name	Votes	Percent	Outcome
Janet Greenip, Rep.	23,256	20%	Won
Robert C. Baldwin, Rep.	23,050	20%	Won
David Boschert, Rep.	23,173	20%	Won
Gayle Powell, Dem.	16,145	14%	Lost
Marcia Richard, Dem.	15,210	13%	Lost
Shelia Schneider, Dem.	14,648	13%	Lost

- 1994 Race for Maryland House of Delegates – District 33

Voters choose three:

Name	Votes	Percent	Outcome
Janet Greenip, Rep.	19,545	20%	Won
Robert C. Baldwin, Rep.	19,628	20%	Won
Marsha G. Perry, Dem.	17,618	18%	Won
David Almy, Rep.	16,390	17%	Lost
David G. Boschert, Dem.	13,485	14%	Lost
Michael F. Canning, Dem.	12,157	12%	Lost
