= Robert R. Neall =

American politician (born 1948)

Secretary Robert R. Neall
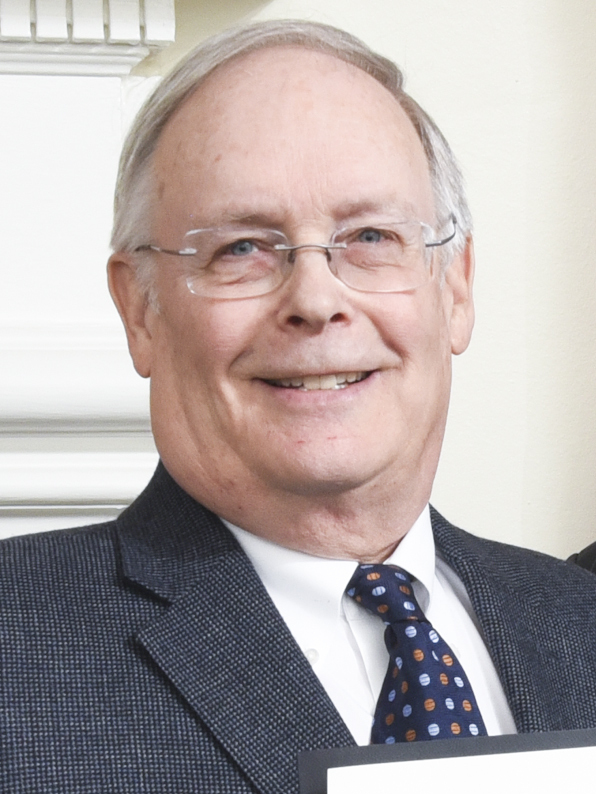
- Neall in 2018

Secretary of the Maryland Department of Health
- In office February 2, 2018 – December 1, 2020 (Acting, January 9 to February 2, 2018)
- Governor: Larry Hogan
- Preceded by: Dennis Schrader (acting)
- Succeeded by: Dennis Schrader (acting)

Member of the Maryland Senate from the 33rd district
- In office December 1996 – January 8, 2003
- Appointed by: Parris Glendening
- Preceded by: John A. Cade
- Succeeded by: Janet Greenip

4th County Executive of Anne Arundel County
- In office 1990–1994
- Preceded by: O. James Lighthizer
- Succeeded by: John G. Gary

Minority Leader of the Maryland House of Delegates
- In office 1983–1987
- Preceded by: Raymond E. Beck
- Succeeded by: Ellen Sauerbrey

Member of the Maryland House of Delegates from the 33rd district
- In office 1975–1987
- Preceded by: Seat established
- Succeeded by: Marsha G. Perry

Personal details
- Born: June 26, 1948 (age 78) Baltimore, Maryland
- Party: Republican (1972–1999; 2014–present)
- Other political affiliations: Democratic (before 1972; 1999–2014)
- Children: 4 children; 10 grandchildren
- Education: Anne Arundel County Public Schools; U.S. Naval Academy Preparatory School, 1967; U.S. Military Academy, 1968–69; Anne Arundel Community College, A.A., 1971; University of Maryland, B.A., 1972; University of Baltimore School of Law, 1973–74.

Military service
- Branch/service: U.S. Navy
- Years of service: 1967–68

Robert R. Neall (born June 26, 1948) is an American politician and Republican in Maryland who has served as state health secretary, state senator, state delegate and county executive of Anne Arundel County.

== Elected offices ==
Originally a Democrat, Neall switched parties in 1972 to become a Republican. Neall was a member of the Maryland House of Delegates from 1975 to 1987, serving as the Minority Whip, 1978–83 and the Minority Leader, 1983–87. He was the Republican nominee for the United States Congress in the 4th District in 1986, losing to Tom McMillen in an extremely close election by 428 votes. He was elected County Executive of Anne Arundel County, Maryland from 1990 to 1994.

After his term ended, Neall was appointed by the Anne Arundel County Republican Central Committee to fill a vacancy as state senator from the 33rd District after the death of John A. Cade. Neall was a member of the Budget and Taxation Committee. Neall was also a member of the Thornton Commission, which developed a plan for distributing money to the state's needier school districts in Baltimore City and Prince George's County and, after legislative compromise, Montgomery County.

In 1999, although the 33rd legislative District is one of Maryland's most conservative with 6,700 more registered Republicans than Democrats, Neall switched parties on ideological grounds and became a Democrat. In a letter to Richard D. Bennett, the state GOP chairman and later U.S. District Court Judge, Neall said, "While I have from time to time felt uncomfortable and unwelcome in the Republican Party, (my) feelings have clearly worsened in recent years" because of the changing nature of the party.

In 2002, Neall was soundly defeated for re-election by Republican Janet Greenip. Afterward, Neall said of his party switch, "I have never ever regretted doing what I thought was right."

== Ehrlich advisor ==
In 2003, Baltimore City schools' chief executive, Bonnie S. Copeland requested that Neall help solve a severe budget deficit. To qualify for a $42 million loan from the state, Gov. Bob Ehrlich requested that Neall draft a plan for fiscal and management accountability. Neall's financial rescue plan was rejected by the Baltimore City School Board, sending the system into crisis as it headed towards insolvency. Neall then created controversy with his abrupt resignation on the day that he delivered his report.

== Hogan advisor ==
Neall rejoined the Republican Party in 2014. In November 2014, then Governor-elect Larry Hogan appointed Neall to his transition team as a special advisor on fiscal policy. Neall was appointed to the University System of Maryland's Board of Regents effective July 1, 2015. He replaced Tom McMillen who defeated Neall for Congress in 1986. In May 2016, Governor Hogan appointed Neall as a senior administration advisor to head an effort to reorganize state government to run more efficiently. On December 21, 2017, Governor Hogan appointed Neall as Secretary of the Maryland Department of Health effective January 9, 2018. In November 2020, he announced his retirement, effective December 1, saying, "These last three years, though trying, have been very rewarding and I simply do not have the strength and vitality to continue. You have to know when to say when."

Preceded by O. James Lighthizer	Anne Arundel County Executive; 1990—1994	Succeeded by John G. Gary
