= John G. Gary =

American politician (1943–2025)

5th County Executive of Anne Arundel County
- In office 1994–1998
- Preceded by: Robert R. Neall
- Succeeded by: Janet S. Owens

Member of the Maryland House of Delegates from the 33A district
- In office 1983 – January 11, 1995
- Succeeded by: Janet Greenip

Personal details
- Born: December 23, 1943 Baltimore, Maryland, U.S.
- Died: July 12, 2025 (aged 81)
- Party: Republican

John G. Gary (December 23, 1943 – July 12, 2025) was an American politician and a Republican who served as County Executive of Anne Arundel County, Maryland, from 1994 to 1998.

Prior to serving as County Executive, Gary was a member of the Maryland House of Delegates from 1983 to 1994.

Gary was defeated for re-election in 1998 by Janet Owens.

== Education ==
Delegate Gary graduated from Glen Burnie High School. He attended Anne Arundel Community College and the University of Maryland.

== Career ==
Delegate Gary earned several awards during his career including Man of the Year from the Young Republicans of Anne Arundel County in 1977 and Legislator of the Year by the American Family Association in 1989. He served as Assistant Minority Whip and was a member of the Constitutional and Administrative Law Committee from 1983 until 1986 and the Appropriations Committee from 1987 until 1994.

== Death ==
Gary died on July 12, 2025, at the age of 81.

== Election results ==
- 1998 Race for Anne Arundel County Executive

Name	Votes	Percent	Outcome
Janet S. Owens, Dem.	87,676	57.8%	Won
John G. Gary, Rep.	63,879	42.1%	Lost
Other Write-Ins	226	0.1%	Lost

- 1990 Race for Maryland House of Delegates – District 33A

Name	Votes	Percent	Outcome
Elizabeth S. Smith, Rep.	15,861	20%	Won
John G. Gary, Rep.	15,607	20%	Won
Marsha G. Perry, Dem.	15,123	19%	Won
Bill Burlison, Rep.	10,128	17%	Lost
Edwin E. Edel, Dem.	15,123	13%	Lost
Sabine N. Bosma, Dem.	7,733	10%	Lost

- 1986 Race for Maryland House of Delegates – District 33A

Name	Votes	Percent	Outcome
Elizabeth S. Smith, Rep.	13,091	20%	Won
John G. Gary, Rep.	12,315	19%	Won
Marsha G. Perry, Dem.	10,476	16%	Won
John Witty, Rep.	10,272	16%	Lost
Bill Burlison, Dem.	9,092	14%	Lost
Douglas W. Diehl, Dem.	8,985	14%	Lost

Preceded by Robert R. Neall	Anne Arundel County Executive; 1994—1998	Succeeded by Janet S. Owens
