= Nathaniel J. McFadden =

American politician

Nathaniel McFadden
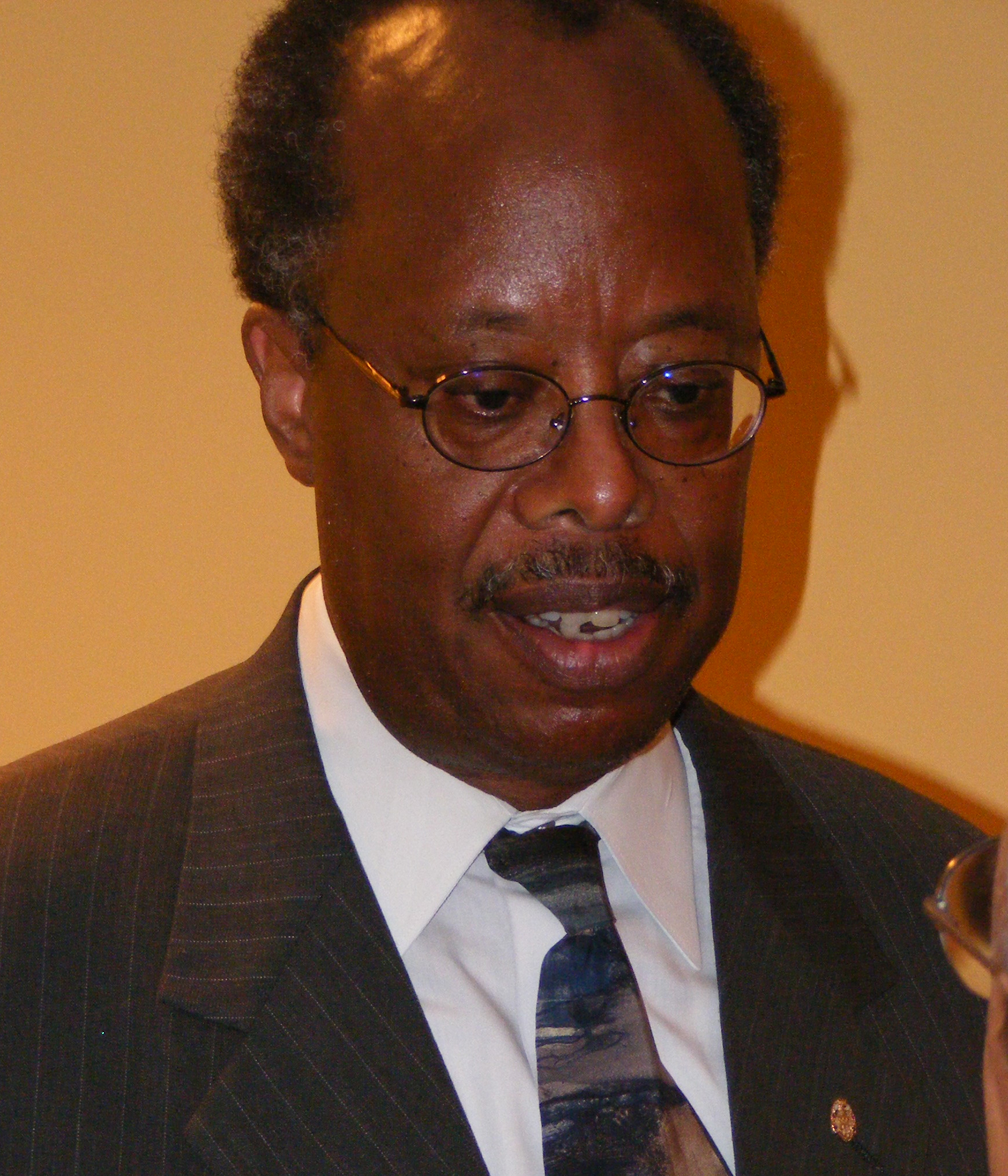

President pro tempore of the Maryland Senate
- In office January 10, 2007 – January 9, 2019
- Preceded by: Ida G. Ruben
- Succeeded by: Kathy Klausmeier

Member of the Maryland Senate from the 45th district
- In office January 11, 1995 – January 9, 2019
- Preceded by: Nathan Irby
- Succeeded by: Cory V. McCray

Personal details
- Born: August 3, 1946 (age 80) Philadelphia, Pennsylvania, U.S.
- Party: Democratic
- Education: Baltimore City College; Morgan State University (BS, MS)

Nathaniel J. McFadden (born August 3, 1946) is an American politician who represented district 45 in the Maryland State Senate from January 11, 1995, to January 9, 2019, and who was the Senate's president pro tem from January 10, 2007, to January 9, 2019.

== Background ==
Born in Philadelphia, Pennsylvania, August 3, 1946, McFadden attended high school at the Baltimore City College, graduating in 1964. McFadden received a B.A. from Morgan State College in geography & history education in 1968. While at Morgan State, he was a brother of Alpha Phi Omega. He also earned an M.S. (history & social sciences), 1972. Educator. Teacher, Dunbar High School, 1968-75. He also was an educator at Lake Clifton-Eastern High School in Baltimore, MD, beginning in 1989 and was an Educational Opportunity Program (EOP) through 1994. He has a wife, three children, and five grandchildren.

== In the legislature ==
McFadden was chairman of the Baltimore City Senate Delegation. He was the President Pro Tem of the Senate after serving as the Majority Leader from 2003 to 2007. Senate Chair, Joint Audit Committee, 2001-. Member, Budget and Taxation Committee, 1995- (public safety, transportation, economic development & natural resources subcommittee, 1995–99; pensions subcommittee, 1995-; education, business & administration subcommittee, 2000-; vice-chair, capital budget subcommittee, 2007-, member, 2003-); Special Joint Committee on Pensions, 1995-;

== Democratic party activist ==
In December 2007, McFadden was chosen by the Obama for President campaign to appear on the ballot as a male delegate for Obama from Maryland's 7th congressional district.

Maryland Senate
Preceded by Adrienne Ruben	President pro tempore of the Maryland Senate; 2007–2019	Succeeded by Kathy Klausmeier
