= John R. Schneider =

American politician

Member of the Maryland Senate from the 8th district
- In office July 2, 2002 – August 27, 2002
- Preceded by: Thomas L. Bromwell
- Succeeded by: Joseph T. Ferraracci

Personal details
- Born: March 31, 1937 Baltimore, Maryland, U.S.
- Died: August 27, 2002 (aged 65) Perry Hall, Maryland, U.S.
- Party: Democratic

John R. Schneider (March 31, 1937—August 27, 2002) was a Democratic State Senator in Maryland, United States.

== Early life and education ==
Schneider was born in Baltimore, on March 31, 1937. He graduated from Dundalk High School in 1956.

== Career ==
Schneider worked as a junior draftsman at the Glenn L. Martin Company in Essex, Maryland from 1961 until 1963. He left Martin's to become a technical illustrator for Engineering Illustrated, Inc. and worked there for two years, 1961-63. After he left that company, he spent the majority of his life working for Allied Signal. In 1995, he became a staff analyst for State Senator Thomas L. Bromwell up until Bromwell left his position in 2002.

== Background ==
Schneider was appointed to the position of State Senator for District 8, which covers portions of Baltimore County, Maryland and Baltimore, by former Maryland Governor Parris Glendening when Thomas L. Bromwell resigned to accept a position with the Maryland Injured Workers Insurance Fund. During his short time in the Maryland State Senate, Schneider was a member of the Finance Committee. Outside of the Senate, he was a member of the Board of Trustees for the Community College of Baltimore.

On August 27, 2002, less than two months after Schneider accepted the position, he died in Perry Hall, Maryland, at age 65. He was replaced by Joseph T. Ferraracci, who was appointed by Governor Glendening on September 17, 2002.
