= Too Tall Hall =

American basketball player (born 1982)

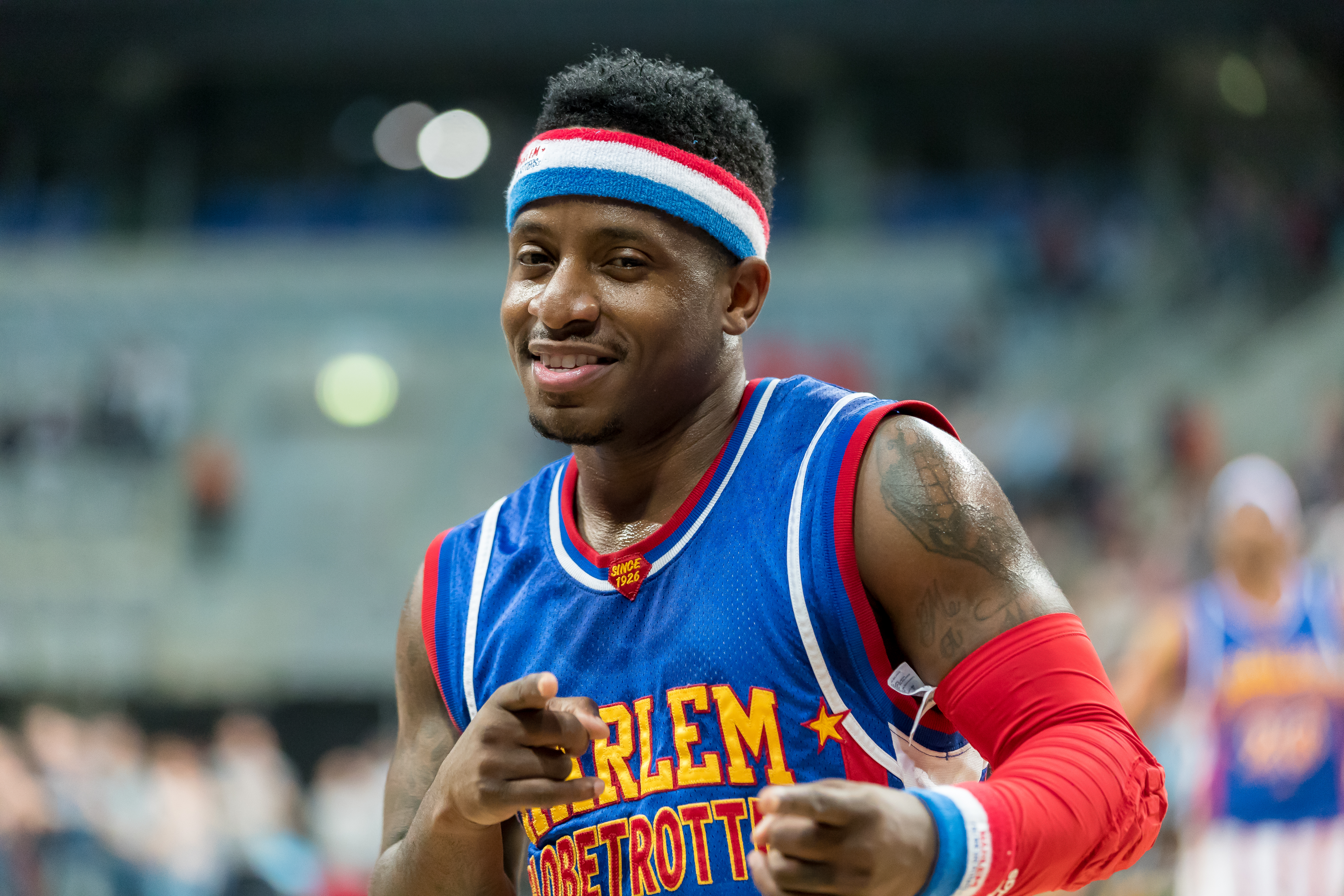
Jonte Hall as "Too Tall" in March 2017 with the Harlem Globetrotters in Mannheim, Germany

Jonte "Too Tall" Hall (born July 2, 1982) is an American basketball player for the Harlem Globetrotters. At 5 feet 2 inches (1.57 m) and 142 pounds (64 kg), he is one of the smallest players in Globetrotter history.

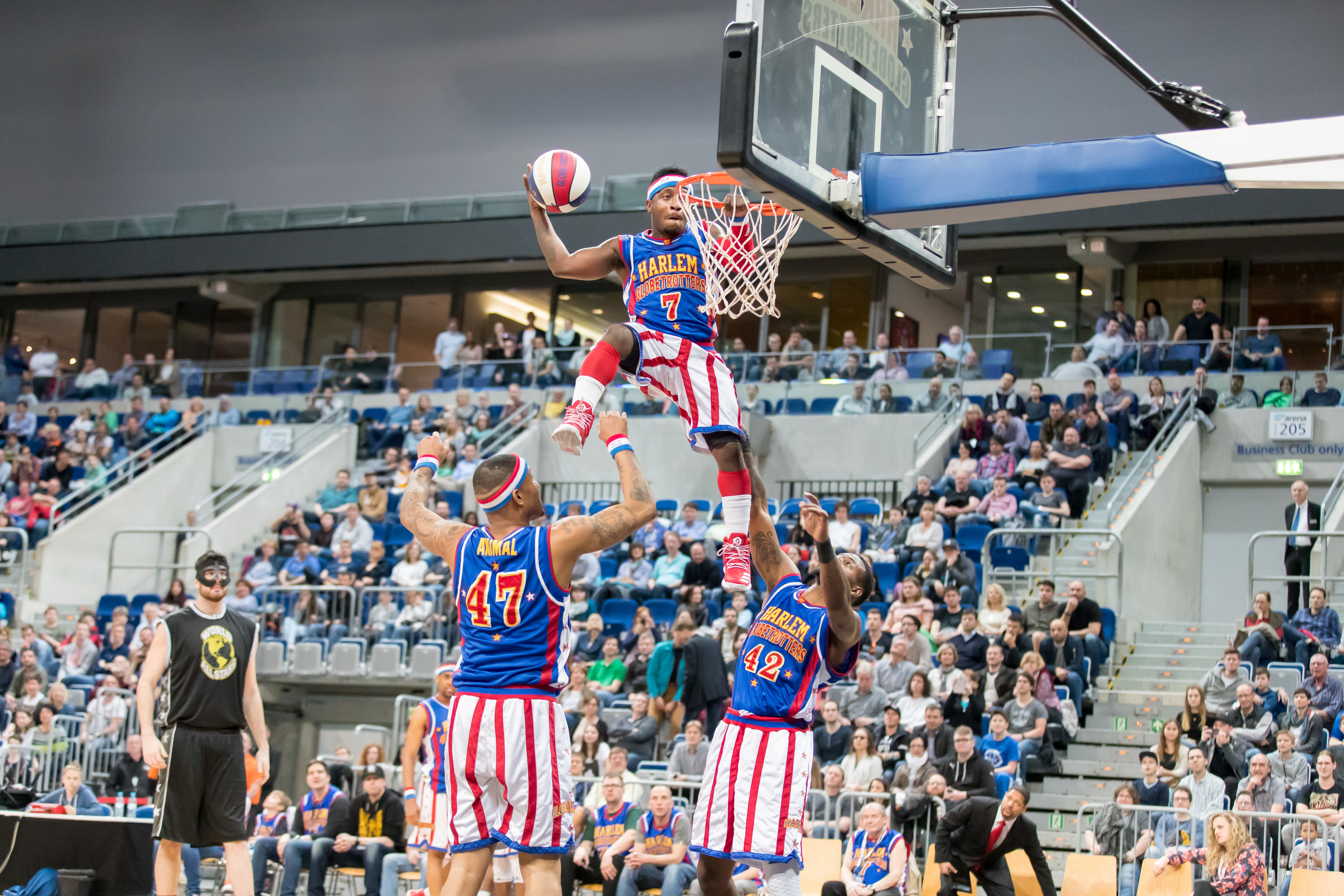
Jonte Hall dunking, with assistance from his teammates, in 2017
