= Sports in Maryland =

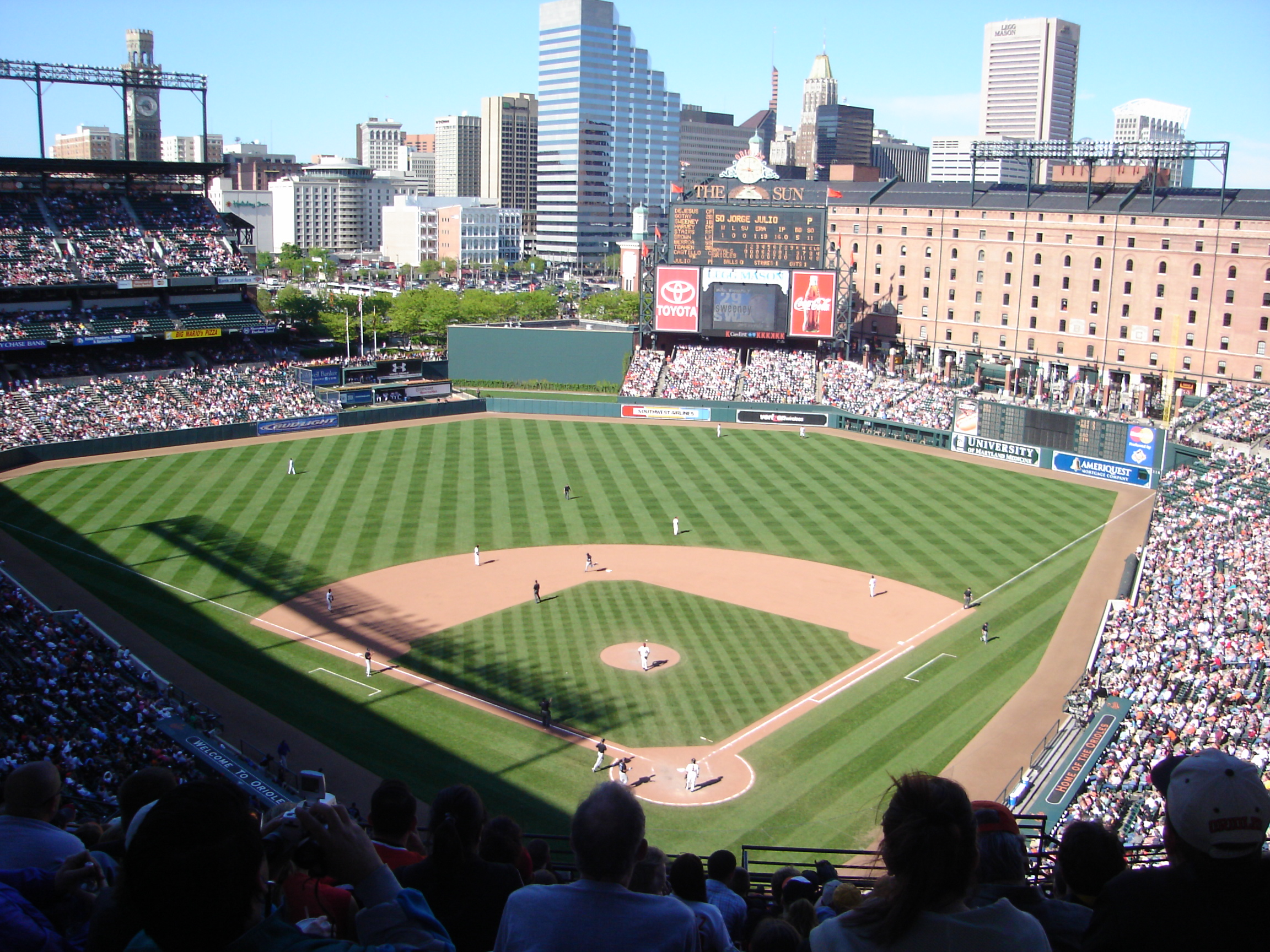
Oriole Park at Camden Yards

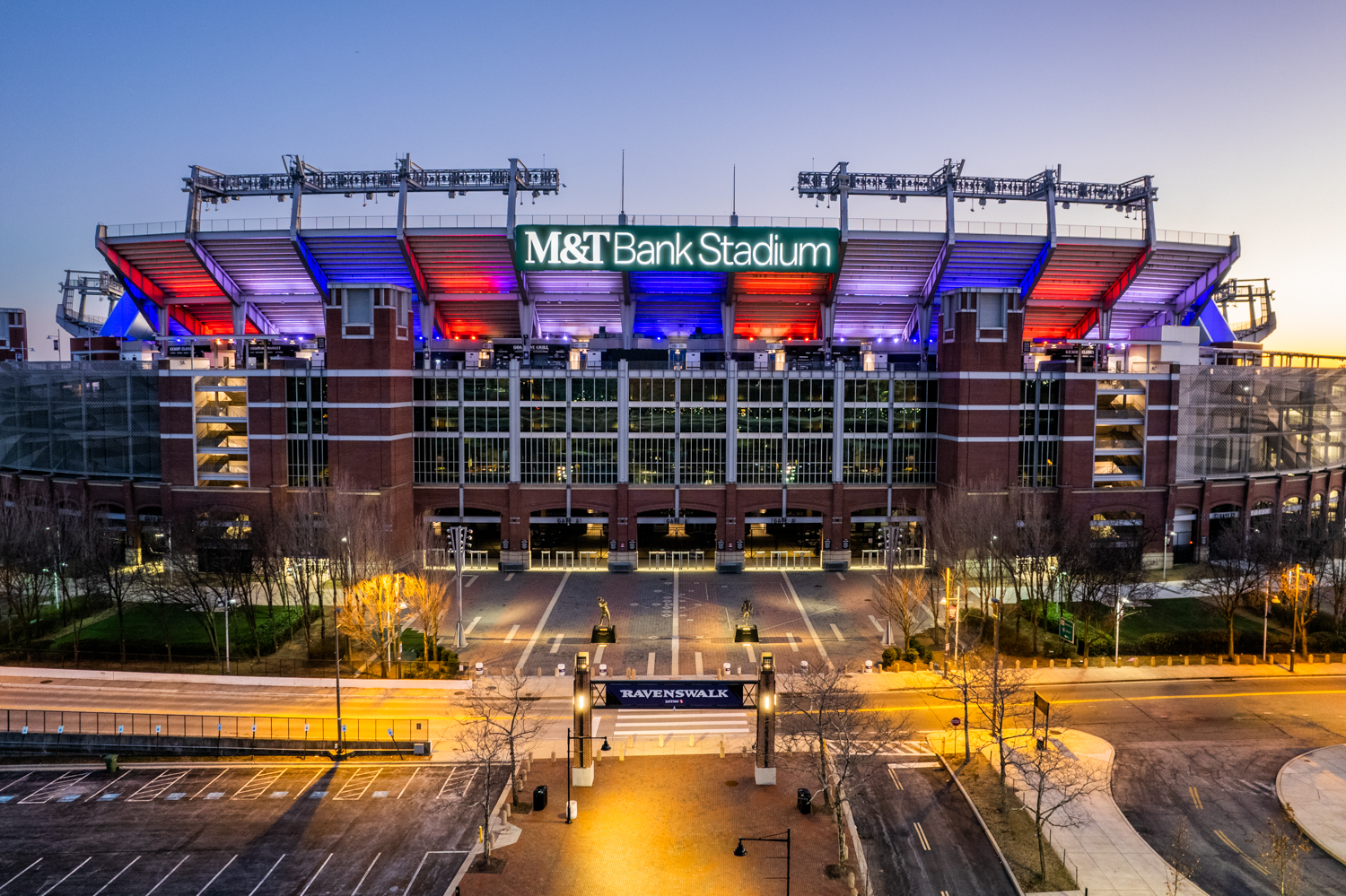
M&T Bank Stadium

The state of Maryland in the Mid-Atlantic region of the United States is home to several professional and amateur sports teams. They include two teams in major leagues, several in minor leagues, and collegiate programs for nine National Collegiate Athletic Association (NCAA) Division I universities. Maryland hosts the Baltimore Orioles of Major League Baseball (MLB) and the Baltimore Ravens of the National Football League (NFL).

Other professional sports franchises in the state include five affiliated minor league baseball teams, one independent league baseball team, the Baltimore Blast indoor soccer team, two indoor football teams, two low-level basketball teams, and three low-level outdoor soccer teams.

The Congressional Country Club has hosted several professional golf tournaments, including the U.S. Open, PGA Championship, U.S. Senior Open, Senior PGA Championship, Kemper Open and Quicken Loans National.

Maryland has had famous athletes including baseball's Al Kaline of the Detroit Tigers, Orioles' Cal Ripken Jr. and George Herman ("Babe") Ruth, who played for the old Orioles, Boston Red Sox, and especially won fame with the New York Yankees. Plus Olympic swimming medalists Michael Phelps, Katie Ledecky, Chase Kalisz, and Katie Hoff.

Since 1962, the official state sport of Maryland is jousting. Lacrosse was named the official team sport in 2004, and Sports Illustrated wrote the sport "has always been the showcase for the flower of Maryland manhood". In 2008, intending to promote physical fitness for all ages, Maryland declared walking the official state exercise and became the first state with an official state exercise.

== Major professional league teams ==
Team name	League	1st MD season	Stadium/Field
Baltimore Orioles	Major League Baseball	1954	Oriole Park at Camden Yards
Baltimore Ravens	National Football League	1996	M&T Bank Stadium
Washington Commanders (until 2030)	National Football League	1997 (played in D.C. 1937–1997)	Northwest Stadium

Maryland has major professional sports teams in the city of Baltimore and in the Maryland suburbs of Washington, D.C. Two major league teams play in Baltimore — MLB's Baltimore Orioles and the NFL's Baltimore Ravens. Additionally, the NFL's Baltimore Colts played in Baltimore from 1953 to 1983 before moving to Indianapolis.

The Washington Commanders (formerly the Washington Redskins) play in Landover, Maryland; the team is expected to move to a new home venue in Washington, D.C. in 2030. The NHL's Washington Capitals and the NBA's Washington Wizards (formerly the Baltimore Bullets, then Washington Bullets) used to play in Maryland before moving in 1997 to a newly constructed Verizon Center arena in downtown Washington in the District of Columbia.

== Other current professional and semi-pro teams ==
=== Baseball ===
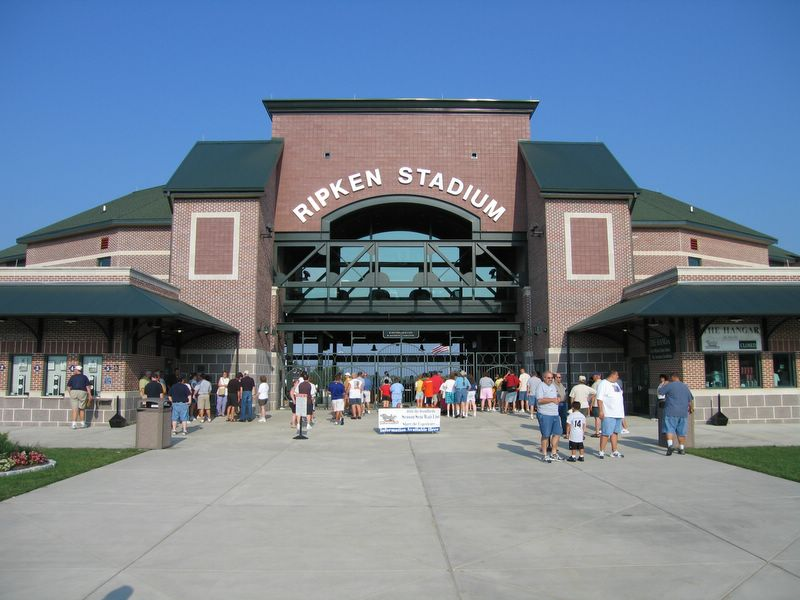
Ripken Stadium

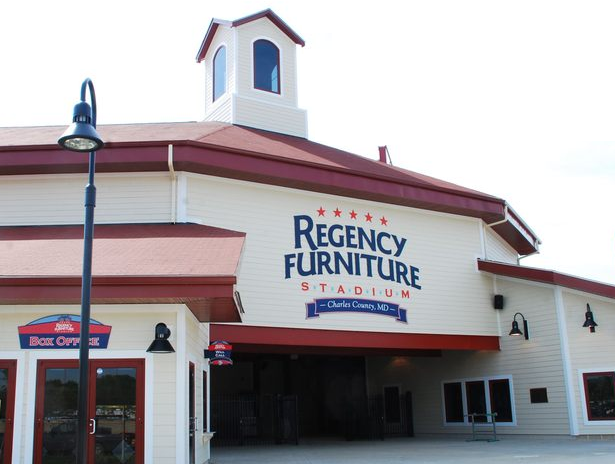
Regency Furniture Stadium

Team	League	1st MD season	Ballpark
Aberdeen IronBirds	MLB Draft League	2002	Ripken Stadium
Chesapeake Baysox	Double-A – Eastern League	1993	Prince George's Stadium
Delmarva Shorebirds	Low-A – Carolina League	1997	Arthur W. Perdue Stadium
Southern Maryland Blue Crabs	Independent – Atlantic League	2008	Regency Furniture Stadium
Frederick Keys	High-A – South Atlantic League	1989	Nymeo Field at Harry Grove Stadium
Hagerstown Flying Boxcars	Independent – Atlantic League	2024	Meritus Park

=== Basketball ===
Team name	League	1st MD season	Stadium/Field
Baltimore Hawks	American Basketball Association	2015	Saint Frances Academy
Frederick Flying Cows	The Basketball League	2024	BB&T Arena at Hood College
PG Valor	American Basketball Association	2016	Antioch Baptist Church

=== Football ===
Team name	League	1st MD season	Stadium/Field
Baltimore Burn	Women's Tackle Football League	2001	Utz Towardowizc field
Baltimore Nighthawks	Women's Football Alliance	2008	Paul Laurence Dunbar High School Stadium
Maryland Eagles	American Arena League 2	2012	Wheaton Sports Pavilion
Maryland Warriors	American Arena League 2	2018	

=== Hockey ===
Team name	League	1st MD season	Stadium/Field
Maryland Black Bears	North American Hockey League	2018–19	Piney Orchard Ice Arena

=== Horse Racing ===
Team name	League	1st MD season	Stadium/Field
Maryland Colts	National Thoroughbred League	2025	Pimlico Race Course

=== Lacrosse ===
Team name	League	1st MD season	Stadium/Field
Maryland Whipsnakes	Premier Lacrosse League	2024	Homewood Field
Maryland Charm	Women's Lacrosse League	2025	

=== Soccer ===
Team name	League	1st MD season	Stadium/Field
Annapolis Blues FC	National Premier Soccer League	2023	Navy-Marine Corps Memorial Stadium
Annapolis United FC	United Women's Soccer	2022	
Baltimore Arsenal	Major Arena Soccer League – Second Division	2023	SECU Arena
Baltimore Blast	Major Arena Soccer League – First Division	1992	SECU Arena
Baltimore Kings	Major Arena Soccer League – Third Division	2022	Annapolis Area Christian School
Christos FC	USL League 2	1997	Moose Athletic Club
Christos FC Women	USL W League	2022	Moose Athletic Club
FC Frederick	National Premier Soccer League	2015	Thomas Athletic Field, Hood College
Maryland Bobcats FC	National Independent Soccer Association	2020	Maryland SoccerPlex
Maryland Elite FC	United Women's Soccer	2022	
Patuxent Football Athletics	USL League 2	2022	The Calverton School
Patuxent Football Athletics Women	USL W League	2022	The Calverton School
Super Green FC Eagles	United Premier Soccer League	2017	Paint Branch High School
Skyline City FC	Major Arena Soccer League – Third Division	2022	Frederick Indoor Sports Center

== Former professional and semi-pro teams ==
=== Baseball ===
The following table details baseball teams which were located in Maryland. For minor league teams that changed affiliations, each affiliation is listed as a separate team.

Team name	Years present	League	Current Status
Aberdeen Arsenal	2000	Atlantic League of Professional Baseball	Defunct
Baltimore Black Sox	1916–1933	Eastern Colored League; American Negro League; Negro National League; East-West League	Defunct
Baltimore Canaries	1872–1874	National Association	Defunct
Baltimore Elite Giants	1938–1950	Negro National League; Negro American League	Defunct
Baltimore Lord Baltimores	1887	National Colored Base Ball League	Defunct
Baltimore Marylands	1873	National Association	Defunct
Baltimore Monumentals	1884	Union Association	Defunct
Baltimore Orioles	1882–1899	American Association (Baseball) National League	Defunct
Baltimore Orioles	1901–1902	American League (Baseball)	New York Yankees
Baltimore Orioles	1903–1914	Eastern League	Syracuse Chiefs
Baltimore Orioles	1916–1953	International League	Defunct
Baltimore Terrapins	1914–1915	Federal League	Defunct
Bowie Nationals	1998	Maryland Fall Baseball	Defunct
Cambridge Canners	1922–1928; 1940–1941	Eastern Shore Baseball League	Defunct
Cambridge Cardinals	1937–1939	Eastern Shore Baseball League	Defunct
Cambridge Dodgers	1946–1949	Eastern Shore Baseball League	Defunct
Centreville Colts	1937–1939	Eastern Shore Baseball League	Defunct
Centreville Orioles	1946	Eastern Shore Baseball League	Defunct
Centreville Red Sox	1940–1941	Eastern Shore Baseball League	Defunct
Crisfield Crabbers	1922–1928; 1937	Eastern Shore Baseball League	Defunct
Cumberland Colts	1916–1918	Potomac League; Blue Ridge League	Defunct
Cumberland Colts	1925–1932; 1941–1942	Middle Atlantic League	Defunct
Cumberland Rooters	1906–1907	Pennsylvania–Ohio–Maryland League; Western Pennsylvania League	Defunct
Delmarva Rockfish	1998	Maryland Fall Baseball	Defunct
Easton Browns	1937	Eastern Shore Baseball League	Defunct
Easton Cubs	1938	Eastern Shore Baseball League	Defunct
Easton Farmers	1924–1928	Eastern Shore Baseball League	Defunct
Easton Yankees	1939–1941; 1946–1949	Eastern Shore Baseball League	Defunct
Federalsburg A's	1937–1941; 1946–1948	Eastern Shore Baseball League	Defunct
Federalsburg Feds	1949	Eastern Shore Baseball League	Defunct
Frederick Champs	1916	Blue Ridge League	Defunct
Frederick Hustlers	1915; 1917; 1920–1928	Blue Ridge League	Defunct
Frederick Regiment	1998	Maryland Fall Baseball	Defunct
Frederick Warriors	1929–1930	Blue Ridge League	Defunct
Frostburg Demons	1916	Potomac League	Defunct
Hagerstown Blues	1915	Blue Ridge League	Defunct
Hagerstown Braves	1950–1953	Interstate League; Piedmont League	Defunct
Hagerstown Champs	1920–1921	Blue Ridge League	Defunct
Hagerstown Hubs	1924–1931	Blue Ridge League; Middle Atlantic League	Defunct
Hagerstown Lions	1896	Cumberland Valley League	Defunct
Hagerstown Owls	1941–1949	Interstate League	Defunct
Hagerstown Packets	1954–1955	Piedmont League	Defunct
Hagerstown Suns	1981–2019	Carolina League; Eastern League; South Atlantic League	Defunct due to MiLB Reorganization of 2020
Hagerstown Terriers	1916–1918; 1922–1923	Blue Ridge League	Defunct
Laurel Blue Hens	1922–1923	Eastern Shore Baseball League	Defunct
Lonaconing Drybugs	1916	Potomac League	Defunct
Piedmont-Westernport Drybugs	1918	Blue Ridge League	Defunct
Pocomoke City Red Sox	1937–1940	Eastern Shore Baseball League	Defunct
Pocomoke City Salamanders	1922–1923	Eastern Shore Baseball League	Defunct
Salisbury A's	1951	Interstate League	Defunct
Salisbury Cardinals	1940–1941; 1946–1949	Eastern Shore Baseball League	Defunct
Salisbury Indians	1922–1928; 1937–1938	Eastern Shore Baseball League	Defunct
Salisbury Reds	1952	Interstate League	Defunct
Salisbury Senators	1939	Eastern Shore Baseball League	Defunct
Spire City Ghost Hounds	2023	Atlantic League of Professional Baseball	On hiatus

=== Basketball ===
Team name	Years present	League	Current status
Arundel Raves	2020	American Basketball Association	Defunct
Baltimore Bayrunners	1999	International Basketball League	Defunct
Baltimore Blaze	2000–2001	National Rookie League	Defunct
Baltimore Bullets	1944–1954	National Basketball Association; Basketball Association of America; American Basketball League	Defunct
Baltimore Bullets	1958–1961	Eastern Professional Basketball League	Defunct
Baltimore Bullets	1963–1973	National Basketball Association	Washington Wizards
Baltimore Claws	1975–1976	American Basketball Association	Defunct
Baltimore Clippers	1939–1941	American Basketball League	Defunct
Baltimore Lightning	1985–1986	Continental Basketball Association	Defunct
Baltimore Metros	1978–1979	Continental Basketball Association	Defunct
Baltimore Orioles	1926–1927	American Basketball League	Defunct
Baltimore Pearls/Bay Lions	2005–2006	American Basketball Association	Defunct
Baltimore Shuckers	2011-2020	Central Basketball Association	Defunct
Beltway Bombers	2016	American Professional Basketball League	Defunct
Cumberland Dukes	1947–1948	All-American Professional Basketball League	Defunct
DMV Warriors	2014–2020	American Basketball Association	Defunct
Hub City Hogs	2019–2020	American Basketball Association	Defunct
Maryland Bayriders	2007–2008	National Professional Basketball League	Defunct
Maryland GreenHawks	2004–2011	Premier Basketball League	Defunct
Maryland Mustangs	2001	United States Basketball League	Defunct
Metropolitan All-Stars	2009–2015	American Professional Basketball League	Defunct
Rockville Victors	2012	American Professional Basketball League	Defunct
Tri-City Suns	2009–2010	American Professional Basketball League	Defunct
Washington Madness	2008–2012	Eastern Basketball Alliance	Relocated to DC
Columbia All-Stars	2014	Eastern Basketball Alliance	
DMV Kings	2014	Eastern Basketball Alliance	
Maryland Bayraiders	2007	Eastern Basketball Alliance	
Western Maryland Elite		Eastern Basketball Alliance	

=== Football ===
Team name	Years	League	Current status
Baltimore Blackbirds	2007	American Indoor Football Association	Defunct
Baltimore Blue Birds	1937	Dixie League	Defunct
Baltimore Brigade	2017–2019	Arena Football League	Defunct
Baltimore Broncos	1963	Atlantic Coast Football League	Defunct
Baltimore Charm	2010–2015	Legends Football League	Defunct
Baltimore Colts	1947–1950	All-America Football Conference (1947–49); National Football League (1950)	Defunct
Baltimore Colts	1953–1984	National Football League	Indianapolis Colts
Baltimore Mariners	2008–2010; 2014	American Indoor Football	Defunct
Baltimore Orioles	1936	Dixie League	Defunct
Baltimore Stallions	1994–1995	Canadian Football League	Montreal Alouettes
Baltimore Stars	1985	United States Football League	Defunct
Central Maryland Seahawks	2013–2015	Women's Football Alliance	Defunct
Chesapeake Tide	2007–2008	Continental Indoor Football League	Defunct
D.C. Divas	2000	Women's Football Alliance	Relocated to Springfield, Virginia
Frederick Falcons	1971	Seaboard Football League	Defunct
Hagerstown Bears	1971–1973	Seaboard Football League	Defunct
Maryland Maniacs	2009	Indoor Football League	Defunct
Maryland Reapers	2012	American Indoor Football	Defunct
Washington-Baltimore Ambassadors	1974	World Football League	Defunct
Washington/Maryland Commandos	1987,1989	Arena Football League	Defunct
Westminster Chargers	1971	Seaboard Football League	Defunct

=== Hockey ===
Team name	Years present	League	Current status
Baltimore Bandits	1995–1997	American Hockey League	Rockford IceHogs
Baltimore Blades	1975–1976	World Hockey Association	Defunct
Baltimore Clippers	1945–1946; 1949–1950	Eastern Amateur Hockey League	Defunct
Baltimore Clippers	1954–1956	Eastern Hockey League	Defunct
Baltimore Clippers	1962–1977	American Hockey League; Eastern Hockey League; Southern Hockey League	Defunct
Baltimore Orioles	1933–1942; 1944–45	Eastern Hockey League	Defunct
Baltimore Skipjacks	1982–1993	American Hockey League	Springfield Thunderbirds
Chesapeake Icebreakers	1997–1999	ECHL	Defunct
Washington Capitals	1974–1997	NHL	Moved to MCI Center, now Capital One Arena
Baltimore Hockey Club (Baltimore HC)	1896–1898	BHL	Defunct

=== Inline Hockey ===
Team name	Years present	League	Current status
Maryland Knights	2007	American Inline Hockey League	Defunct
Washington Power	2008	Major League Roller Hockey	Defunct

=== Lacrosse ===
Team name	Years present	League	Current status
Baltimore Bombers	2013	North American Lacrosse League	Defunct
Baltimore Brave	2018–2020	Women's Professional Lacrosse League	Defunct (folding of league)
Baltimore Ride	2016–2018	United Women's Lacrosse League	Defunct
Baltimore Tribe	1988	American Lacrosse League	Defunct
Baltimore Thunder	1987–1999	Major Indoor Lacrosse League	Colorado Mammoth
Chesapeake Bayhawks	2001–2020	Major League Lacrosse	Defunct (merger of MLL into PLL)
Maryland Arrows	1974–1975	National Lacrosse League	Defunct
Washington Wave	1987–1989	Major Indoor Lacrosse League	Defunct

=== Soccer ===
Team name	Years present	League	Current status
ACF Torino USA	2014–2015	Women's Premier Soccer League	Defunct
ASA Charge	2010–2017	National Premier Soccer League	Defunct
ASA Chesapeake Charge	2010–2015	Women's Premier Soccer League	Defunct
Baltimore Americans	1934–1949	American Soccer League	Defunct
Baltimore Bays	1967–1969	National Professional Soccer League (1967); North American Soccer League (1968–1969)	Defunct
Baltimore Bays	1972–1973	American Soccer League	Defunct
Baltimore Bays	1993–1998	USL Second Division	Defunct
Baltimore Blast	1980–1992	Major Indoor Soccer League	Defunct
Baltimore Bohemians	2012–2016	Premier Development League	on hiatus
Baltimore Comets	1974–1975	North American Soccer League	Defunct
Baltimore St. Gerards/Baltimore Flyers	1966–1968	American Soccer League	Defunct
Baltimore Orioles F.C.	1893–1895	American League of Professional Football	Defunct
Baltimore Rockets/Baltimore Pompei	1953–1961	American Soccer League	Defunct
Baltimore S.C.	1943–1948	American Soccer League	Defunct
Charm City FC	2008–2009	National Premier Soccer League	Defunct
Chesapeake Dragons	2001–2004	Premier Development League	Defunct
Crystal Palace Baltimore	2007–2010	USL Second Division; USSF Division 2 Professional League	On Hiatus
D.C. United Women	2011–2012	W-League	Became Washington Spirit
Eastern Shore Sharks	1998–1999	USL Second Division	Defunct
FC Baltimore Christos	2018–2021	National Premier Soccer League	Defunct
IFK Maryland	2016	American Soccer League	Defunct
Maryland Bays	1988–1991	American Soccer League; American Professional Soccer League	Defunct
Maryland Mania	1999	A-League	Defunct
Maryland Pride	1995–2007, 2009–2010	Women's Premier Soccer League	Defunct
Maryland Tigers	2007–2008	Premier Arena Soccer League	Defunct
Real Maryland F.C.	2007–2013	USL Second Division	Defunct
Washington Freedom	2001–2011	Women's Professional Soccer	Defunct
Washington Spirit	2012–2019	National Women's Soccer League	Moved to Audi Field in Washington, D.C. and Segra Field in Leesburg, Virginia
Washington Warthogs	1994–1997	Continental Indoor Soccer League	Defunct

=== Other sports ===
Team name	Years present	League	Current status
D.C. Forward	2004	Pro Cricket	Defunct
Baltimore Monuments	1977	Professional softball leagues	Defunct
DC Breeze	2013–2014	American Ultimate Disc League	Move to Washington DC
Baltimore Banners	1974	World TeamTennis	Defunct
Baltimore Blues	2012–2014	USA Rugby League	Defunct

== Collegiate sports ==
=== NCAA Division I ===
==== Coppin State University ====
The Coppin State University sports teams participate in NCAA Division I as a member of the Mid-Eastern Athletic Conference (MEAC) for most sports, with baseball competing in the Northeast Conference (NEC). Its teams are called the Eagles.

Sport	Gender	Venue
Baseball	Men's	Joe Cannon Stadium
Basketball	Men's & Women's	Physical Education Complex
Bowling	Women's	
Cross Country	Men's & Women's	
Softball	Women's	Coppin State University Softball Complex
Tennis	Men's & Women's	Coppin State Tennis Courts
Track & Field	Men's & Women's	
Volleyball	Women's	Physical Education Complex

==== Johns Hopkins University ====
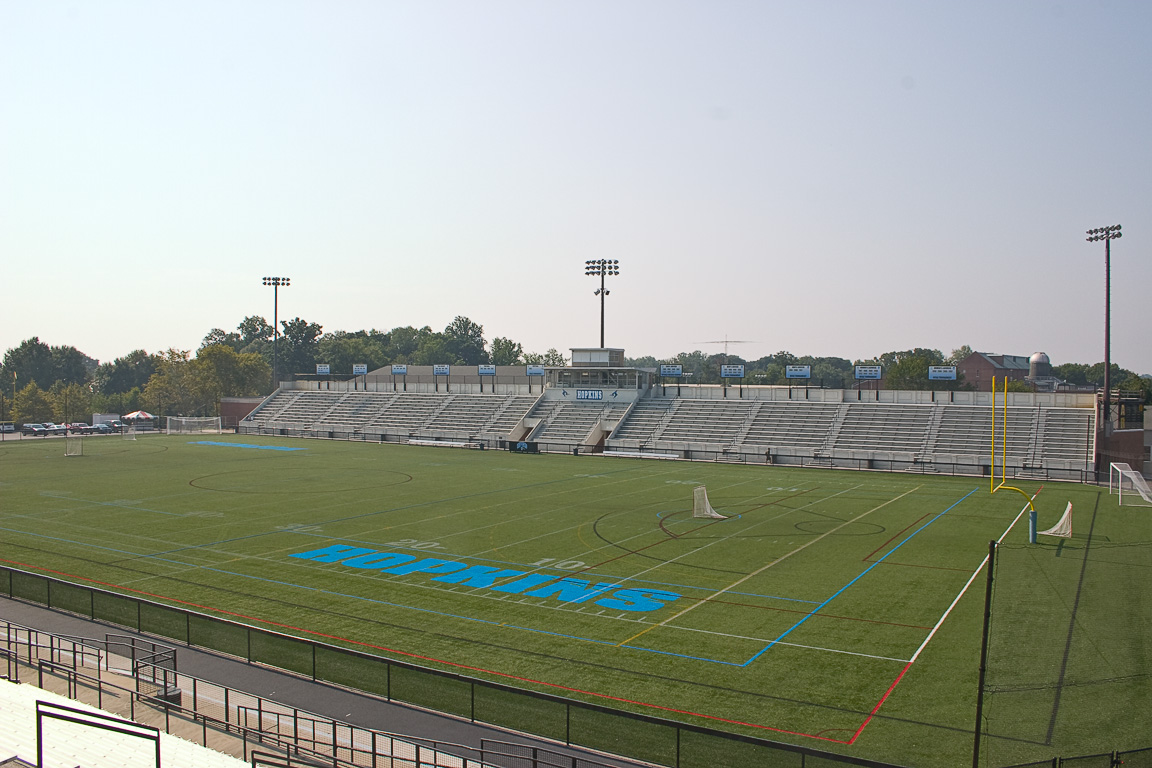
Homewood Field

The Johns Hopkins Blue Jays men's lacrosse team, founded in 1883, is the school's most prominent sports team, which has won 44 national titles. The Blue Jays play at Homewood Field (pictured right). Lacrosse is the only sport in which Hopkins participates as an NCAA Division I member; both the men's and women's lacrosse teams compete at that level in the Big Ten Conference. All other Hopkins sports compete in NCAA Division III, in which athletic scholarships are not allowed. Hopkins is one of a small number of Division III schools authorized by the NCAA to continue awarding scholarships in their Division I sports.

Sport	Gender	Venue
Lacrosse	Men's & Women's	Homewood Field

==== Loyola University Maryland ====
Loyola fields 17 varsity teams and 22 club teams. The varsity teams, known as the Greyhounds, participate in the NCAA's Division I. All Loyola varsity teams compete in the Patriot League in the following sports:

Sport	Gender	Venue
Basketball	Men's & Women's	Reitz Arena
Cross Country	Men's & Women's	
Golf	Men's	
Lacrosse	Men's & Women's	Ridley Athletic Complex
Rowing	Men's & Women's	
Soccer	Men's & Women's	Ridley Athletic Complex
Swimming & Diving	Men's & Women's	Mangione Pool at the Fitness & Aquatics Center
Tennis	Men's & Women's	McClure Tennis Center at Ridley Athletic Complex
Track & Field	Women's	Loyola/Johns Hopkins Track & Field Facility
Volleyball	Women's	Reitz Arena

==== Morgan State University ====
The Morgan State University athletic teams are members of the Mid-Eastern Athletic Conference. Their teams are called the Bears and compete in the following sports:

- Basketball – Men's & Women's
- Bowling – Women's
- Cheer – Women's
- Cross Country – Men's & Women's
- Football – Men's
- Softball – Women's
- Tennis – Men's & Women's
- Track & Field – Women's
- Volleyball – Women's

==== Mount St. Mary's University ====
Mount St. Mary's University was one of the founding members of the Northeast Conference, but moved in 2022 to the Metro Atlantic Athletic Conference. The school's sports teams are called the Mountaineers and compete in the following sports:

- Baseball – Men's
- Basketball – Men's & Women's
- Cross Country – Men's & Women's
- Lacrosse – Men's
- Softball – Women's
- Soccer – Men's & women's
- Swimming – Women's
- Tennis – Men's & Women's
- Track & Field (Indoor and Outdoor) – Men's & Women's
- Water Polo – Men's & Women

==== Towson University ====
The athletics teams of Towson University participate in the NCAA's Division I and are members of the Colonial Athletic Association, as well as CAA Football, the technically separate football league operated by that conference. Some sports compete in the Eastern College Athletic Conference. The school's sports teams are called the Tigers, and the mascot of the university is named Doc.

Sport	Gender	Venue
Baseball	Men's	Schuerholz Park
Basketball	Men's & Women's	Towson Center
Cross Country	Women's	Oregon Ridge Park
Field Hockey	Women's	Johnny Unitas Stadium
Football	Men's	Johnny Unitas Stadium
Golf	Men's & Women's	Prospect Bay Country Club
Gymnastics	Women's	Towson Center
Lacrosse	Men's & Women's	Johnny Unitas Stadium
Soccer	Men's & Women's	Towson Center
Softball	Women's	Towson Center
Swimming	Men's & Women's	Burdick Hall
Tennis	Women's	Towson Center
Track & Field	Women's	
Volleyball	Women's	Towson Center

==== United States Naval Academy ====
The United States Naval Academy participates in NCAA Division I in 30 varsity sports. It also fields teams in 12 club sports. The academy is a non-football member of the Patriot League, a football-only member of the American Athletic Conference, and a member of the Collegiate Sprint Football League (men), Eastern Association of Rowing Colleges (men), Eastern Association of Women's Rowing Colleges, Eastern Intercollegiate Gymnastics League (men), and Eastern Intercollegiate Wrestling Association. Navy is also one of approximately 300 members of the Eastern College Athletic Conference (ECAC). Although the teams have no official name, they are usually referred to as "Navy", "Midshipmen", or "Mids". The academy competes in the following sports:

Varsity sports

- Baseball – Men's
- Basketball – Men's and women's
- Crew (heavyweight) – Men's and women's
- Crew (lightweight) – Men's and women's
- Cross Country – Men's and women's
- Football – Men's
- Golf – Men's
- Gymnastics – Men's
- Lacrosse – Men's and women's
- Rifle – Coeducational
- Sailing (intercollegiate) – Coeducational
- Sailing (offshore) – Coeducational
- Soccer – Men's and women's
- Sprint Football – Men's
- Squash – Men's
- Swimming & diving – Men's and women's
- Tennis – Men's and women's
- Track & Field (Indoor and Outdoor) – Men's and women's
- Volleyball – Women's
- Water Polo – Men's
- Wrestling – Men's

Club sports

- Boxing – Men's
- Cycling – Coeducational
- Hockey (ice) – Men's
- Karate – Coeducational
- Marathon – Coeducational
- Pistol – Coeducational
- Powerlifting – Coeducational
- Rugby – Men's and women's
- Softball – Women's
- Triathlon – Coeducational
- Volleyball – Men's

==== University of Maryland, Baltimore County ====
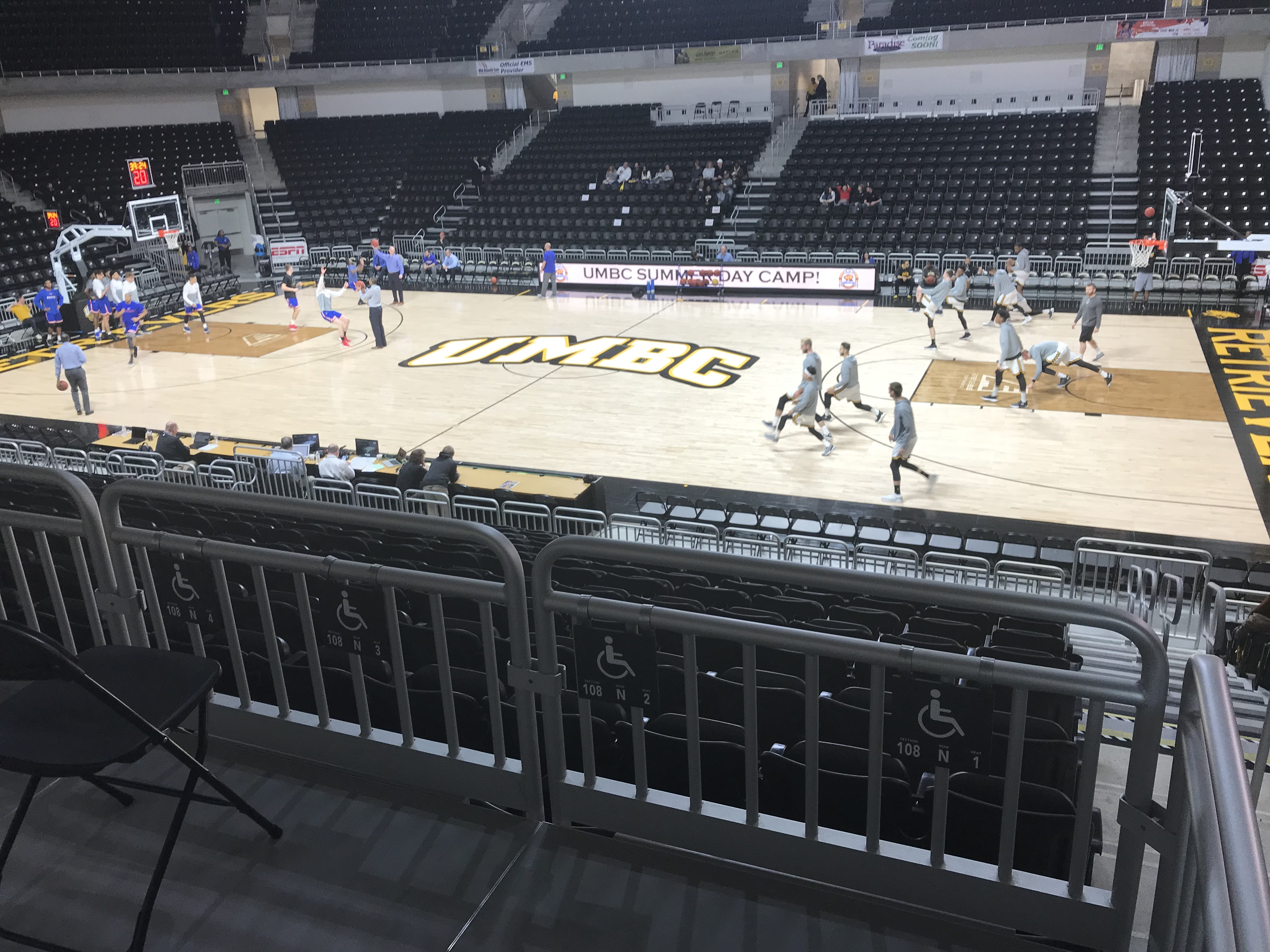
Chesapeake Employers Insurance Arena

The University of Maryland, Baltimore County sports teams participate in the NCAA's Division I, and is member of the America East Conference. The school's sports teams are called the Retrievers, and the mascot of the university is a Chesapeake Bay Retriever which has been referred to as both True Grit and Fever.

Sport	Gender	Venue
Baseball	Men's	The Baseball Factory Field at UMBC
Basketball	Men's & Women's	Chesapeake Employers Insurance Arena
Cross Country	Men's & Women's	UMBC Stadium
Lacrosse	Men's & Women's	UMBC Stadium
Soccer	Men's & Women's	UMBC Soccer Stadium
Softball	Men's & Women's	Baseball Factory Field
Swimming	Men's & Women's	UMBC Natatorium
Tennis	Men's & Women's	Tennis Center
Track & Field	Men's & Women's	UMBC Stadium
Volleyball	Women's	Chesapeake Employers Insurance Arena

==== University of Maryland, College Park ====
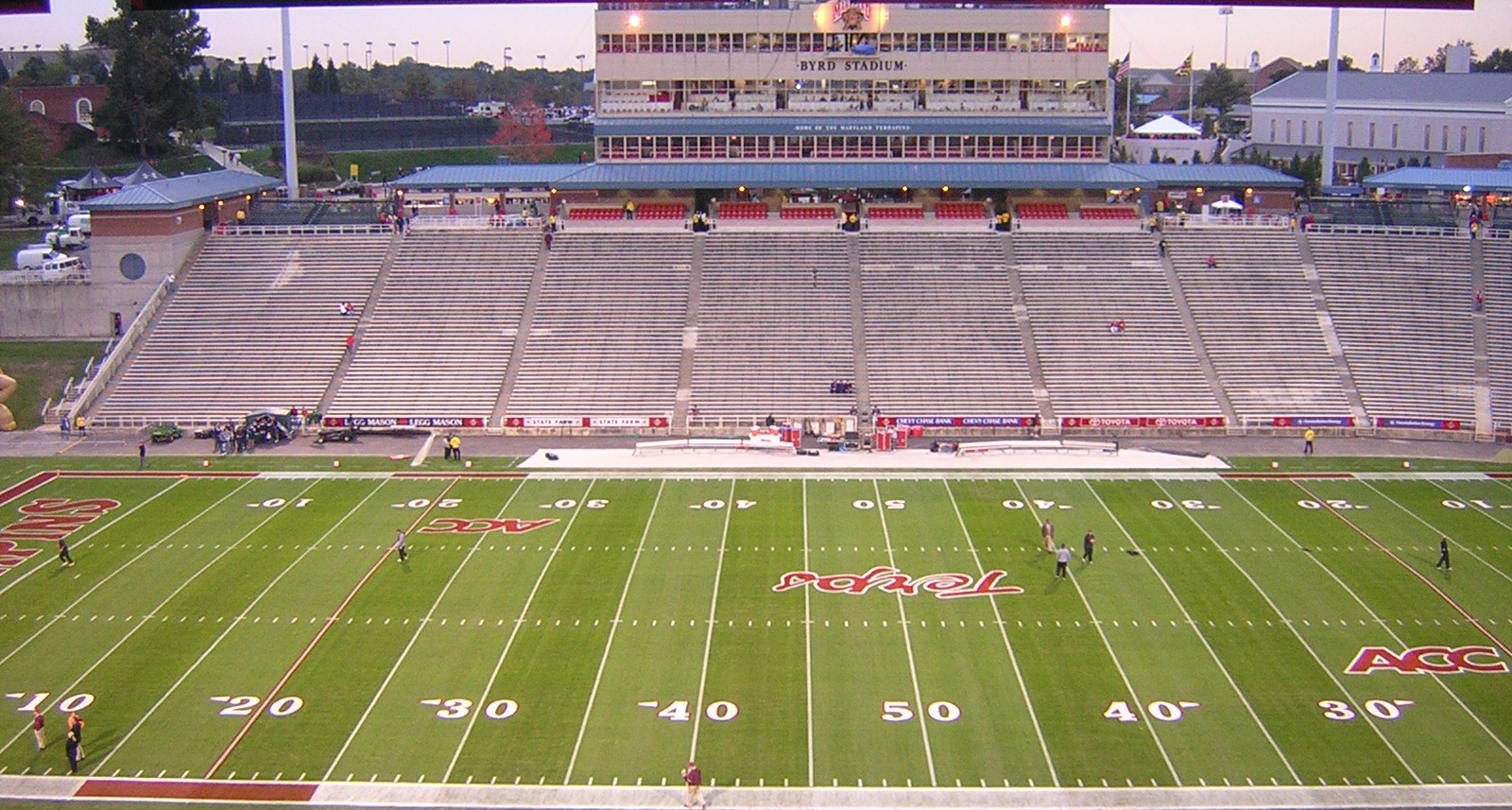
Maryland Stadium

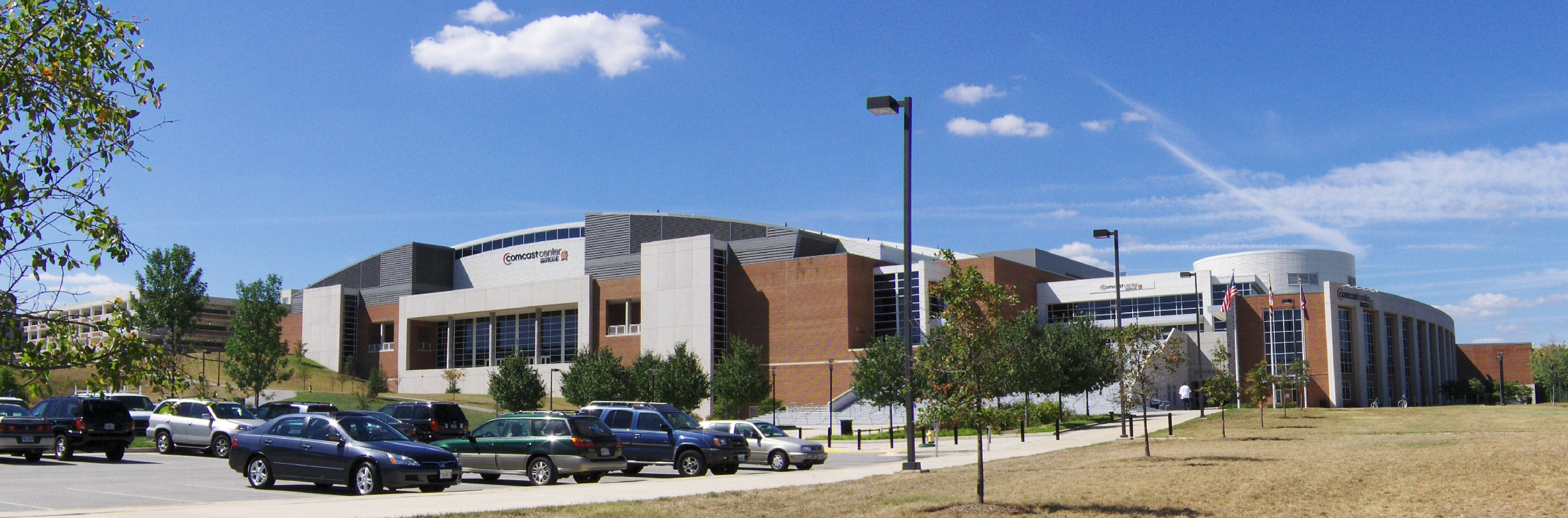
Xfinity Center

The University of Maryland, College Park sports teams participate in NCAA Division I as a member of the Big Ten Conference. Prior to 2014, the school participated in Division I as a member of the Atlantic Coast Conference, of which it was a founding member. Its teams are called the Terrapins, and its mascot is a diamondback terrapin named Testudo.

Sport	Gender	Venue
Baseball	Men's	Shipley Field
Basketball	Men's & Women's	Xfinity Center
Competitive Cheer	Coed	Xfinity Center
Cross Country	Men's & Women's	Kehoe Track at Ludwig Field
Field Hockey	Women's	Field Hockey & Lacrosse Complex
Football	Men's	Maryland Stadium
Golf	Men's & Women's	Maryland Golf Course
Lacrosse	Men's & Women's	Maryland Stadium; Field Hockey & Lacrosse Complex / Ludwig Field
Soccer	Men's & Women's	Ludwig Field
Swimming	Men's & Women's	Eppley Recreation Center Natatorium
Tennis	Men's & Women's	Tennis Center at College Park
Track & Field	Men's & Women's	Kehoe Track at Ludwig Field
Volleyball	Women's	Xfinity Center
Water Polo	Women's	Eppley Recreation Center Natatorium
Wrestling	Men's	Xfinity Center

=== NCAA Division II ===
==== Bowie State University ====
The Bowie State University athletic teams are members of the Central Intercollegiate Athletic Association. Their teams are called the Bulldogs and compete in the following sports:

- Basketball – Men's & Women's
- Bowling – Women's
- Cross Country – Men's & Women's
- Football – Men's
- Softbal – Women's
- Track & Field (Indoor and Outdoor) – Men's & Women's
- Volleyball – Women's

==== Frostburg State University ====
The Frostburg State Bobcats began a transition from Division III to Division II in July 2019, joining the Mountain East Conference. The Bobcats will be eligible for Division II national championships in the 2022–23 school year. The following sports are sponsored:

- Baseball – Men's
- Basketball – Men's & Women's
- Cross Country – Men's & Women's
- Field Hockey – Women's
- Football – Men's
- Lacrosse – Women's (plays in the East Coast Conference because the Mountain East sponsors lacrosse only for men)
- Soccer – Men's & Women's
- Softball – Women's
- Swimming – Men's & Women's
- Tennis – Men's & Women's
- Track & Field (Indoor and Outdoor) – Men's & Women's
- Volleyball – Women's

=== NCAA Division III ===
==== Goucher College ====
Goucher College athletic teams are members of the Landmark Conference. Their teams are called the Gophers and compete in the following sports:

- Basketball – Men's & Women's
- Cross Country – Men's & Women's
- Equestrian – Women's
- Field Hockey – Women's
- Lacrosse – Men's
- Soccer – Men's & Women's
- Swimming – Men's & Women's
- Tennis – Men's & Women's
- Track & Field (Indoor and Outdoor) – Men's & Women's
- Volleyball – Women's

==== Johns Hopkins University ====
Except for the men's and women's lacrosse teams, Johns Hopkins athletic teams are members of the Centennial Conference and compete in the following sports:

- Baseball – Men's
- Basketball – Men's & Women's
- Crew – Men's & Women's
- Cross Country – Men's & Women's
- Fencing – Men's & Women's
- Field Hockey – Men's
- Football – Men's
- Soccer – Men's & Women's
- Swimming – Men's & Women's
- Tennis – Men's & Women's
- Track & Field (Indoor and Outdoor) – Men's & Women's
- Volleyball – Women's
- Water Polo – Men's & Women's
- Wrestling – Men's

==== Hood College ====
Hood College's athletic teams are members of the Middle Atlantic Conferences. Their teams are called the Blazers and compete in the following sports:

- Basketball – Men's & Women's
- Cross Country – Men's & Women's
- Field Hockey – Women's
- Golf – Men's & Women's
- Lacrosse – Men's & Women's
- Soccer – Men's & Women's
- Softball – Women's
- Swimming – Men's & Women's
- Tennis – Men's & Women's
- Track & Field – Men's & Women's
- Volleyball – Women's

==== McDaniel College ====
McDaniel College athletic teams are members of the Centennial Conference. Their teams are called the Green Terror and compete in the following sports:

- Baseball – Men's
- Basketball – Men's & Women's
- Cross Country – Men's & Women's
- Field Hockey – Women's
- Football – Men's
- Golf – Men's and Women's
- Lacrosse - Men's and Women's
- Soccer – Men's & Women's
- Softball – Women's
- Swimming – Men's & Women's
- Tennis – Men's & Women's
- Track & Field (Indoor and Outdoor) – Men's & Women's
- Volleyball – Women's
- Wrestling – Men's

==== Notre Dame of Maryland University ====
Notre Dame athletic teams are members of the Colonial States Athletic Conference. Their teams are called the Gators and compete in the following sports:

- Basketball – Women's
- Field Hockey – Women's
- Lacrosse – Women's
- Soccer – Women's
- Softball – Women's
- Swimming – Women's
- Tennis – Women's
- Volleyball – Women's

==== St. Mary's College of Maryland ====
St. Mary's College athletic teams are members of the Coast to Coast Athletic Conference, but will move to the North Eastern Athletic Conference after the 2020–21 school year. Their teams are called the Seahawks and compete in the following sports:

- Baseball – Men's
- Basketball – Men's & Women's
- Field Hockey – Women's
- Lacrosse – Men's
- Sailing – Men's & Women's
- Soccer – Men's & Women's
- Swimming – Men's & Women's
- Tennis – Men's & Women's
- Softball – Women's
- Volleyball – Men's & Women's

==== Salisbury University ====
Salisbury University athletic teams are members of the Coast to Coast Athletic Conference except for the football team, which plays in the Empire 8. Their teams are called the Seagulls and compete in the following sports:

- Baseball – Men's
- Basketball – Men's & Women's
- Cross Country – Men's & Women's
- Football – Men's
- Field Hockey – Women's
- Lacrosse – Men's
- Soccer – Men's & Women's
- Softball – Women's
- Swimming – Men's & Women's
- Tennis – Men's & Women's
- Track & Field – Men's & Women's
- Volleyball – Women's

==== Stevenson University ====
Stevenson University athletic teams are members of the Eastern College Athletic Conference as well as the Middle Atlantic Conferences. Their teams are called the Mustangs and compete in the following sports:

- Baseball – Men's
- Basketball – Men's & Women's
- Cheer – Men's & Women's
- Cross Country – Men's & Women's
- Dance – Women's
- Golf – Men's & Women's
- Field Hockey – Women's
- Football – Men's
- Ice Hockey – Men's (2016–17) and Women's
- Lacrosse – Men's
- Soccer – Men's & Women's
- Tennis – Men's & Women's
- Softball – Women's
- Volleyball – Men's & Women's

==== Washington College ====
Washington College athletic teams are members of the Centennial Conference, except for the sailing team which competes in the Middle Atlantic Intercollegiate Sailing Association. Their teams are called the Shoremen/Shorewomen and compete in the following sports:

- Baseball – Men's
- Basketball – Men's & Women's
- Field Hockey – Women's
- Lacrosse – Men's & Women's
- Rowing – Men's & Women's
- Sailing – CoEd
- Soccer – Men's & Women's
- Softball – Women's
- Swimming – Men's & Women's
- Tennis – Men's & Women's
- Volleyball – Women's

=== Collegiate Summer Baseball ===
==== Cal Ripken Collegiate Baseball League ====
The Cal Ripken Collegiate Baseball League (CRCBL) is a collegiate summer baseball league located in the Washington, D.C. metropolitan area. Of the eight teams in the league, five play home games in Maryland.

Team	City	Stadium
Bethesda Big Train	Bethesda, Maryland	Shirley Povich Field
Gaithersburg Giants	Gaithersburg, Maryland	Criswell Automotive Field at Kelley Park
Olney Cropdusters	Olney, Maryland	First Responder Field by ServPro at OBGC Park
Silver Spring-Takoma Thunderbolts	Silver Spring, Maryland	Montgomery Blair Baseball Stadium at Montgomery Blair High School
Southern Maryland Senators	Waldorf, Maryland	Regency Furniture Stadium

==== MLB Draft League ====
The MLB Draft League is a collegiate summer baseball league that began play in 2021. Created by Major League Baseball (MLB) and Prep Baseball Report, the league serves as a showcase for top draft-eligible prospects leading up to each summer's MLB draft. The league's initial six teams were formerly members of Minor League Baseball's New York–Penn League, Eastern League, and Carolina League before MLB's reorganization of the minors for 2021.

Team	City	1st MD season	Stadium
Aberdeen IronBirds	Abingdon, Maryland	2002	Ripken Stadium

== High school ==
=== Baltimore Catholic League ===
The Baltimore Catholic League (BCL), is a competitive basketball association composed of private Catholic high schools in the Baltimore, Maryland geographic area.

- St. Frances Academy
- Calvert Hall College High School
- Loyola Blakefield (originally Loyola High School)
- St. Maria Goretti High School
- The Cardinal Gibbons School (originally Cardinal Gibbons High School)
- Archbishop Spalding High School
- Mount Saint Joseph College (high school)

=== Interscholastic Athletic Association of Maryland ===
The Interscholastic Athletic Association of Maryland (or IAAM), established 1993, is a girls’ sports conference for parochial / private / independent high schools generally located in the Baltimore metropolitan area but extending to various other regions, including the state's mostly rural Eastern Shore.

- Annapolis Area Christian School
- Archbishop Spalding High School
- Beth Tfiloh School
- Bryn Mawr School
- Chapelgate Christian Academy
- Catholic High School of Baltimore
- Concordia Preparatory School
- Friends School of Baltimore
- Garrison Forest School
- Glenelg Country School
- Institute of Notre Dame
- The John Carroll School
- The Key School
- McDonogh School
- Mount Carmel School
- Maryvale Preparatory School
- Mercy High School
- Mount de Sales Academy
- Oldfields School
- Notre Dame Preparatory School
- Roland Park Country School
- Park School of Baltimore
- Severn School
- Seton Keough High School
- St. Frances Academy
- Saint John's Catholic Prep (St. John's Literary Institution), Frederick
- St. Mary's High School
- St. Paul's School for Girls
- St. Timothy's School
- St. Vincent Pallotti High School
- Towson Catholic High School

=== Maryland Interscholastic Athletic Association ===
The Maryland Interscholastic Athletic Association (or MIAA) established 1993, is a boys' sports conference for parochial / private / independent high schools generally located in the Baltimore metropolitan area but extending to various other regions, including the state's mostly rural Eastern Shore.

- Annapolis Area Christian School
- Archbishop Curley High School
- Archbishop Spalding High School
- Beth Tfiloh School
- Boys' Latin School
- Calvert Hall College High School
- Cardinal Gibbons School
- Chapelgate Christian Academy
- Concordia Preparatory School
- Friends School of Baltimore
- Georgetown Preparatory School (Football Only)
- Gilman School
- Glenelg Country School
- The John Carroll School
- The Key School
- Loyola Blakefield (formerly Loyola High School)
- McDonogh School
- Mount Saint Joseph College (high school)
- Our Lady of Mount Carmel School
- Park School of Baltimore
- Severn School
- St. Frances Academy
- St. John's Prospect Hall
- St. Mary's High School
- St. Paul's School
- St. Vincent Pallotti High School
- Saints Peter & Paul High School
- Towson Catholic High School

=== Maryland Public Secondary Schools Athletic Association ===
The Maryland Public Secondary Schools Athletic Association (MPSSAA) oversees public high school sporting contests in the state of Maryland.

==== Member High schools ====
===== Allegany County =====
- Allegany High School, Cumberland
- Mountain Ridge High School, Frostburg
- Fort Hill High School, Cumberland

===== Anne Arundel County =====
- Anne Arundel County Public Schools
- Annapolis High School, Annapolis
- Arundel High School, Gambrills
- Broadneck High School, Annapolis
- Chesapeake High School, Pasadena
- Glen Burnie High School, Glen Burnie
- Meade Senior High School, Fort Meade
- North County High School, Glen Burnie
- Northeast Senior High School, Pasadena
- Old Mill High School, Millersville
- Severna Park High School, Severna Park
- South River High School, Edgewater
- Southern High School, Harwood

===== Baltimore City =====
- Baltimore City College, Baltimore
- Baltimore Polytechnic Institute, Baltimore
- Banks High School, Baltimore
- Carver Vocational Technical High School, Baltimore
- Doris M. Johnson High School, Baltimore
- Paul Laurence Dunbar High School, Baltimore
- Edmondson-Westside High School, Baltimore
- Frederick Douglass Senior High School, Baltimore
- Forest Park Senior High School, Baltimore
- Lake Clifton/Eastern High School, Baltimore
- Mergenthaler Vocational Technical High School, Baltimore
- Northwestern High School, Baltimore
- Patterson High School, Baltimore
- Reginald F. Lewis High School, Baltimore
- Dr. Samuel L. Banks High School, Baltimore
- Southwestern High School, Baltimore
- Walbrook High School, Baltimore
- W. E. B. Dubois High School, Baltimore
- Western High School, Baltimore

===== Baltimore County =====
- Catonsville High School, Catonsville
- Chesapeake High School, Essex
- Dulaney High School, Timonium
- Dundalk High School, Dundalk
- Eastern Technical High School, Essex
- Franklin High School, Reisterstown
- Hereford High School, Parkton
- Kenwood High School, Essex
- Lansdowne Academy of Finance, Lansdowne
- Loch Raven High School, Towson
- Milford Mill Academy, Baltimore
- Overlea High School, Baltimore
- Owings Mills High School, Owings Mills
- Parkville Center for Mathematics, Science, and Computer Science, Parkville
- Patapsco High School, Dundalk
- Perry Hall High School, Perry Hall
- Pikesville High School, Pikesville
- Randallstown High School, Randallstown
- Sparrows Point High School, Sparrows Point
- Towson Law & Public Policy High School (Towson High School), Towson
- Western Technical High School, Catonsville
- Woodlawn High School, Woodlawn

===== Calvert County =====
- Huntingtown High School Huntingtown
- Northern High School (Owings, Maryland)
- Calvert High School (Prince Frederick, Maryland)
- Patuxent High School Lusby

===== Caroline County =====
- Colonel Richardson High School, Federalsburg
- North Caroline High School, Ridgely

===== Carroll County =====
- Century High School, Sykesville
- Francis Scott Key High School, Union Bridge
- Liberty High School, Eldersburg
- Manchester Valley High School, Manchester
- North Carroll High School, Hampstead
- South Carroll High School, Sykesville
- Westminster Senior High School, Westminster
- Winters Mill High School, Westminster
- Manchester Valley High School, Manchester

===== Cecil County =====
- Elkton High School, Elkton
- North East High School, North East
- Perryville High School, Perryville
- Rising Sun High School, Rising Sun

===== Charles County =====
- Henry E. Lackey High School, Indian Head
- La Plata High School, La Plata
- Maurice J. McDonough High School, Pomfret
- North Point High School, Waldorf
- Thomas Stone High School, Waldorf
- Westlake High School, Waldorf

===== Dorchester County =====
- Cambridge-South Dorchester High School, Cambridge
- North Dorchester High School, Hurlock

===== Frederick County =====
- Brunswick High School, Brunswick
- Catoctin High School, Thurmont
- Frederick High School, Frederick
- Governor Thomas Johnson High School, Frederick
- Linganore High School, Frederick
- Oakdale High School, Frederick
- Middletown High School, Middletown
- Tuscarora High School, Frederick
- Urbana High School, Urbana
- Walkersville High School, Walkersville

===== Garrett County =====
- Northern Garrett High School, Accident
- Southern Garrett High School, Oakland

===== Harford County =====
- Aberdeen High School, Aberdeen
- Bel Air High School, Bel Air
- C. Milton Wright High School, Bel Air
- Edgewood High School, Edgewood
- Fallston High School, Fallston
- Harford Technical High School, Bel Air
- Havre De Grace High School, Havre De Grace
- Joppatowne High School, Joppa
- Patterson Mill High School, Bel Air
- North Harford High School, Pylesville

===== Howard County =====
- Atholton High School, Columbia
- Centennial High School, Ellicott City
- Glenelg High School, Glenelg
- Hammond High School, Columbia
- Howard High School, Ellicott City
- Long Reach High School, Columbia
- Marriotts Ridge High School, Marriotsville
- Mount Hebron High School, Ellicott City
- Oakland Mills High School, Columbia
- Reservoir High School, Fulton
- River Hill High School, Clarksville
- Wilde Lake High School, Columbia

===== Kent County =====
- Kent County High School, Worton

===== Montgomery County =====
- Albert Einstein High School, Kensington
- Bethesda-Chevy Chase High School, Bethesda
- Clarksburg High School, Clarksburg
- Colonel Zadok A. Magruder High School, Rockville
- Damascus High School, Damascus
- Gaithersburg High School, Gaithersburg
- James Hubert Blake High School, Silver Spring
- John F. Kennedy High School, Silver Spring
- Montgomery Blair High School, Silver Spring
- Northwest High School, Germantown
- Northwood High School, Silver Spring
- Paint Branch High School, Burtonsville
- Poolesville High School, Poolesville
- Quince Orchard High School, Gaithersburg
- Richard Montgomery High School, Rockville
- Rockville High School, Rockville
- Seneca Valley High School, Germantown
- Sherwood High School, Sandy Spring
- Springbrook High School, Silver Spring
- Thomas Edison High School of Technology, Silver Spring
- Thomas Sprigg Wootton High School, Rockville
- Walt Whitman High School, Bethesda
- Walter Johnson High School, Bethesda
- Watkins Mill High School, Gaithersburg
- Wheaton High School, Wheaton
- Winston Churchill High School, Potomac

===== Prince George's County =====
- Prince George's County Public Schools
- Bladensburg High School, Bladensburg
- Bowie High School, Bowie
- Central High School, Capitol Heights
- Crossland High School, Temple Hills
- Frederick Douglass High School, Upper Marlboro
- Forestville Military Academy, Forestville
- DuVal High School, Lanham
- Fairmont Heights High School, Capitol Heights
- Charles Herbert Flowers High School, Springdale
- Friendly High School, Fort Washington
- Gwynn Park High School, Brandywine
- High Point High School, Beltsville
- Largo High School, Upper Marlboro
- Laurel High School, Laurel
- Northwestern High School, Hyattsville
- Oxon Hill High School, Oxon Hill
- Parkdale High School, Riverdale
- Potomac High School, Oxon Hill
- Eleanor Roosevelt High School, Greenbelt
- Suitland High School, Forestville
- Surrattsville High School, Clinton

===== Queen Anne's County =====
- Kent Island High School, Stevensville
- Queen Anne's County High School, Centreville

===== St. Mary's County =====
- Chopticon High School, Morganza
- Great Mills High School, Great Mills
- Leonardtown High School, Leonardtown

===== Somerset County =====
- Crisfield High School, Crisfield
- Washington High School, Princess Anne

===== Talbot County =====
- Easton High School, Easton
- St. Michaels Middle/High School, St. Michaels

===== Washington County =====
- Boonsboro High School, Boonsboro
- Clear Spring High School, Clear Spring
- Hancock Middle-Senior High School, Hancock
- North Hagerstown High School, Hagerstown
- Smithsburg High School, Smithsburg
- South Hagerstown High School, Hagerstown
- Williamsport High School, Williamsport

===== Wicomico County =====
- James M. Bennett High School, Salisbury
- Mardela Middle and High School, Mardela Springs
- Parkside High School, Salisbury
- Wicomico High School, Salisbury

===== Worcester County =====
- Pocomoke High School, Pocomoke City
- Snow Hill High School, Snow Hill
- Stephen Decatur High School, Berlin

=== Washington Catholic Athletic Conference ===
The Washington Catholic Athletic Conference or WCAC is a high school athletic league for boys, girls, and co-ed Catholic high schools located around and in Washington, D.C., United States.

- Academy of the Holy Cross
- Archbishop Carroll High School
- Bishop Ireton High School
- Bishop O'Connell High School
- Bishop McNamara High School
- DeMatha Catholic High School
- Elizabeth Seton High School
- Gonzaga College High School
- Our Lady of Good Counsel High School
- Paul VI Catholic High School
- St. John's College High School
- St. Mary's Ryken High School

=== Maryland Interscholastic Sailing Association League ===
High School sailing in the state of Maryland is regulated and run independently of all other sports in the state. Rather than any of the aforementioned conferences or leagues, sailing is instead regulated under its own body called the Maryland Interscholastic Sailing Association. This body is a part of the wider High School-age Interscholastic Sailing Association, which regulates High School Sailing in the United States. Sailing is unique amongst High School sports in Maryland in that it does not split private and public schools into different leagues, is entirely co-ed, and allows middle schoolers to participate in limited competitions. Schools which participated in the Fall 2024 Season are shown below.

- Annapolis High School
- Archbishop Spalding
- Bethesda - Chevy Chase High School
- Bishop O’Connell High School
- Broadneck High School
- Calvert Hall College High School
- Crofton High School
- Friends School of Baltimore
- Gilman School
- Great Mills High School
- The Gunston School
- Indian Creek School
- Kent Island High School
- Leonardtown High School
- Loyola Blakefield High School
- Patuxent Sailing Team
- Saints Peter and Paul
- Severn School
- Severna Park High School
- South River High School
- Southern High School
- St. John's College High School
- St. Mary's High School
- St. Mary's Ryken High School
- St. Stephens St. Agnes High School
- Templeton Academy
- The Key School
- The Tome School
- Walt Whitman High School
- Washington Latin School

== Horse racing ==
Horse racing has a very long history in Maryland going back to colonial days. The Preakness Stakes, the middle jewel in the Triple Crown, is run at Pimlico Race Course in Baltimore. Presently, Maryland has three Thoroughbred tracks and two Harness Tracks.

Track name	Location	Type
Laurel Park Racecourse	Laurel	Thoroughbred
Ocean Downs	Berlin	Harness
Pimlico Race Course	Baltimore	Thoroughbred
Rosecroft Raceway	Fort Washington	Harness
Timonium Racetrack	Timonium	Thoroughbred

== See also ==
- Maryland#Sports
- List of sports venues in Maryland
- List of athletes from Maryland A – M
- List of athletes from Maryland N – Z
- List of people from Maryland#Athletes
