= Maryland Interscholastic Athletic Association =

High school sports conference

The Maryland Interscholastic Athletic Association (M.I.A.A.) is a boys' sports conference for private high schools generally located in the Baltimore metropolitan area but extending to various other regions, including the state's mostly rural Eastern Shore. The M.I.A.A. has 27 member schools and offers competition in 17 sports. In most sports, it offers multiple levels of competition, including Varsity, Junior Varsity, and Freshmen-Sophomore teams, and the conference is broken down by separate leagues in each. In addition, members are sorted in accordance with continual performance; categories include 'A', 'B', or 'C' Conferences. Teams of the Association (League) may move up or down according to their performance spanning over the course of a year or so to maintain the competition at appropriate levels. Such levels vary for each sport; a school with a "B-Conference" lacrosse team can have an "A-Conference" soccer team: it all depends on the athletic performance of that particular sport.

Seven members of the M.I.A.A. (along with non-MIAA member St. Maria Goretti) also form the Baltimore Catholic League in boys basketball. In addition, many of the same schools compete in the simultaneously organized, all-female "Interscholastic Athletic Association of Maryland" in various girls' sports, together with the all-female schools of the same region.

== Sports ==
"Fall"

- Cross Country
- Football
- Soccer
- Volleyball
- Water Polo

"Winter"

- Basketball
- Ice Hockey
- Indoor Track & Field
- Squash
- Swimming
- Wrestling

"Spring"

- Baseball
- Golf
- Lacrosse
- Rugby
- Tennis
- Track & Field

== History ==
Formed in 1994, the M.I.A.A., was the successor organization for boys to the former Maryland Scholastic Association, formed in 1919, through the leadership of Dr. Phillip H. Edwards.

In 2010, MIAA commissioner Rick Diggs said that a proposed merger with the Washington Catholic Athletic Conference would not be merging for football.

== Member schools ==
- Annapolis Area Christian School
- Archbishop Curley High School
- Archbishop Spalding High School
- Beth Tfiloh Dahan Community School
- The Boys' Latin School of Maryland
- Calvert Hall College (high school)
- Chapelgate Christian Academy
- Concordia Preparatory School
- Cristo Rey Jesuit High School
- The Friends School of Baltimore
- Gerstell Academy
- The Gilman School
- Glenelg Country School
- Jemicy School
- The John Carroll School
- The Key School
- Loyola High School (at Blakefield)
- The McDonogh School
- Mount Saint Joseph College (high school)
- Our Lady of Mount Carmel High School
- The Park School of Baltimore
- The Severn School
- St. Frances Academy
- St. John's Catholic Preparatory School (formerly St.John's Literary Institution)
- St. Mary's High School
- The St. Paul's School
- St. Vincent Pallotti High School
- Saints Peter & Paul High School
- Indian Creek School
