= Interscholastic Athletic Association of Maryland =

- Abbreviation: IAAM
- Formation: 1999
- Legal status: Association
- Headquarters: Pasadena, Maryland
- Region served: Baltimore Metro Area
- Members: 29 schools
- Executive Director: Susan Thompson
- Main organ: Executive Committee
- Website: www.iaamsports.com

The Interscholastic Athletic Association of Maryland (IAAM) is an association of schools that organize the junior and varsity female athletic programs in the area in and around the Baltimore Metro area. It is headquartered in Pasadena, Maryland.

== Background ==
The IAAM was formed in 1999, by combining two existing girls' athletic leagues, A.I.S. and the Catholic League.

In the inaugural year, 30 schools participated. St. Vincent Pallotti joined in 2002. Arlington Baptist left in 2005 after winning men's and women's basketball titles back to back. Annapolis Area Christian joined in 2006. Towson Catholic left abruptly after closing in 2009. Indian Creek School became a provisional member in 2010 and a full member for the 2012/13 season. Baltimore Lutheran changed its name to Concordia Preparatory in 2014. Seton Keough closed in 2016. Gerstell Academy became a full member in 2018 after being a provisional member the year before. The Institute of Notre Dame closed in 2020 due to the combined effects of a fire and the COVID-19 pandemic. In 2023, Oldfields School were preparing to close (before a fundraiser saved the school) and thus left the IAAM.

== Varsity team sports ==
Fall	Winter	Spring
Cross-Country	Basketball	Badminton
Field Hockey	Indoor Soccer	Golf
Soccer	Indoor Track	Lacrosse
Tennis	Swimming	Softball
Volleyball		Track & Field

== Member schools ==
School	Mascot	Location
Annapolis Area Christian School	Eagles	Severn, Maryland
Archbishop Spalding	Cavaliers	Severn, Maryland
Beth Tfiloh Dahan Community School	Warriors	Baltimore, Maryland
Bryn Mawr School	Mawrtians	Baltimore, Maryland
The Catholic High School of Baltimore	Cubs	Baltimore, Maryland
Chapelgate Christian Academy	Yellowjackets	Marriottsville, Maryland
Concordia Preparatory School	Saints	Towson, Maryland
Friends School of Baltimore	Quakers	Baltimore, Maryland
Garrison Forest School	Grizzlies	Owings Mills, Maryland
Gerstell Academy	Falcons	Finksburg, Maryland
Glenelg Country School	Dragons	Ellicott City, Maryland
Indian Creek School	Eagles	Crownsville, Maryland
The John Carroll School	Patriots	Bel Air, Maryland
The Key School	Obezags	Annapolis, Maryland
Maryvale Preparatory School	Lions	Brooklandville, Maryland
McDonogh School	Eagles	Owings Mills, Maryland
Mercy High School	Magic	Baltimore, Maryland
Mount de Sales Academy	Sailors	Catonsville, Maryland
Notre Dame Prep	Blazers	Towson, Maryland
Our Lady of Mount Carmel	Cougars	Baltimore, Maryland
Park School of Baltimore	Bruins	Brooklandville, Maryland
Roland Park Country School	Reds	Baltimore, Maryland
St. Frances Academy	Panthers	Baltimore, Maryland
St. John's Catholic Prep	Vikings	Frederick, Maryland
St. Mary's High School	Saints	Annapolis, Maryland
Severn School	Admirals	Severna Park, Maryland
St. Paul's School for Girls	Gators	Brooklandville, Maryland
St. Timothy's School	Big Blue	Stevenson, Maryland
St. Vincent Pallotti High School	Panthers	Laurel, Maryland
