= List of athletes from Maryland N – Z =

A number of notable amateur and professional athletes are from Maryland, including Cal Ripken Jr., Michael Phelps and Babe Ruth.

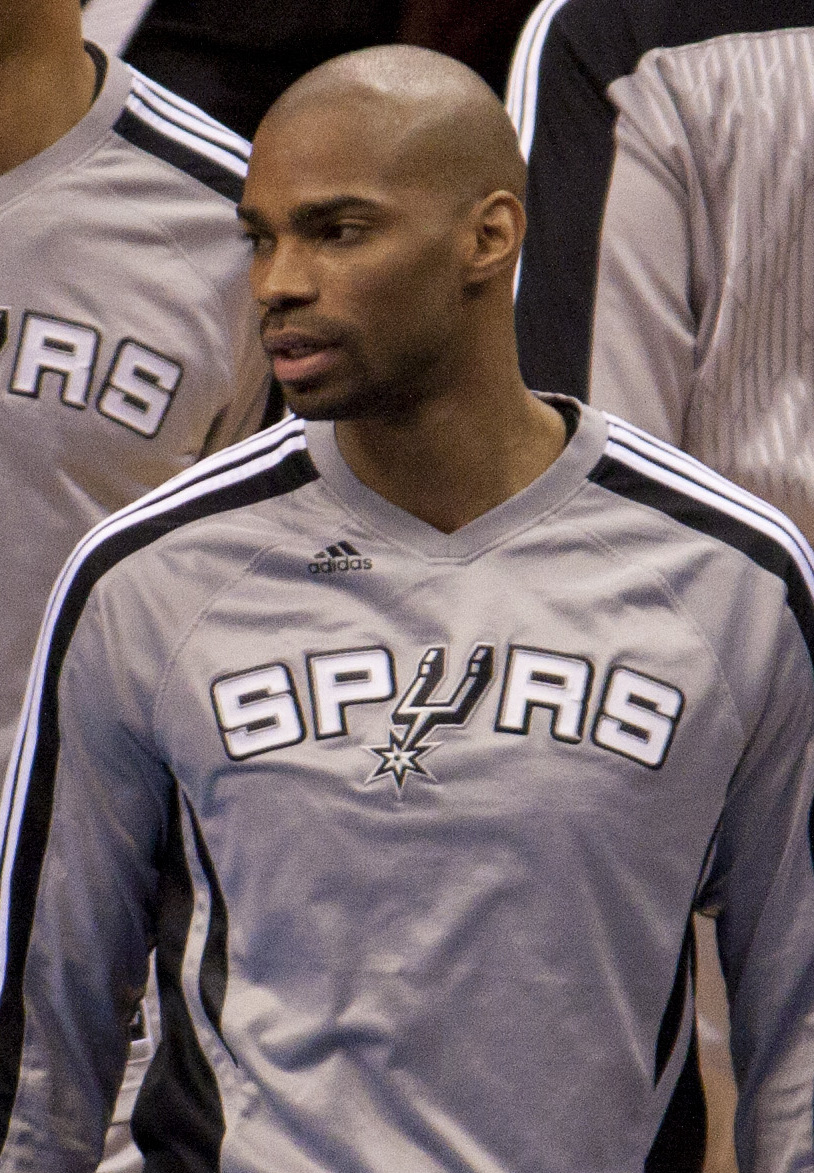
Gary Neal, native of Baltimore, Maryland

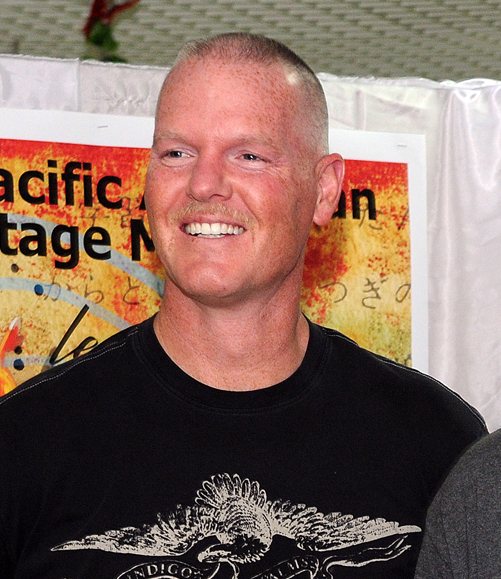
Jeff Nelson, native of Baltimore, Maryland

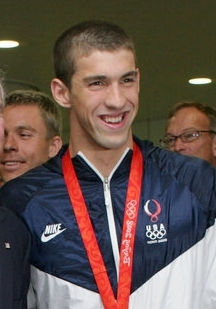
Michael Phelps, native of Baltimore, Maryland

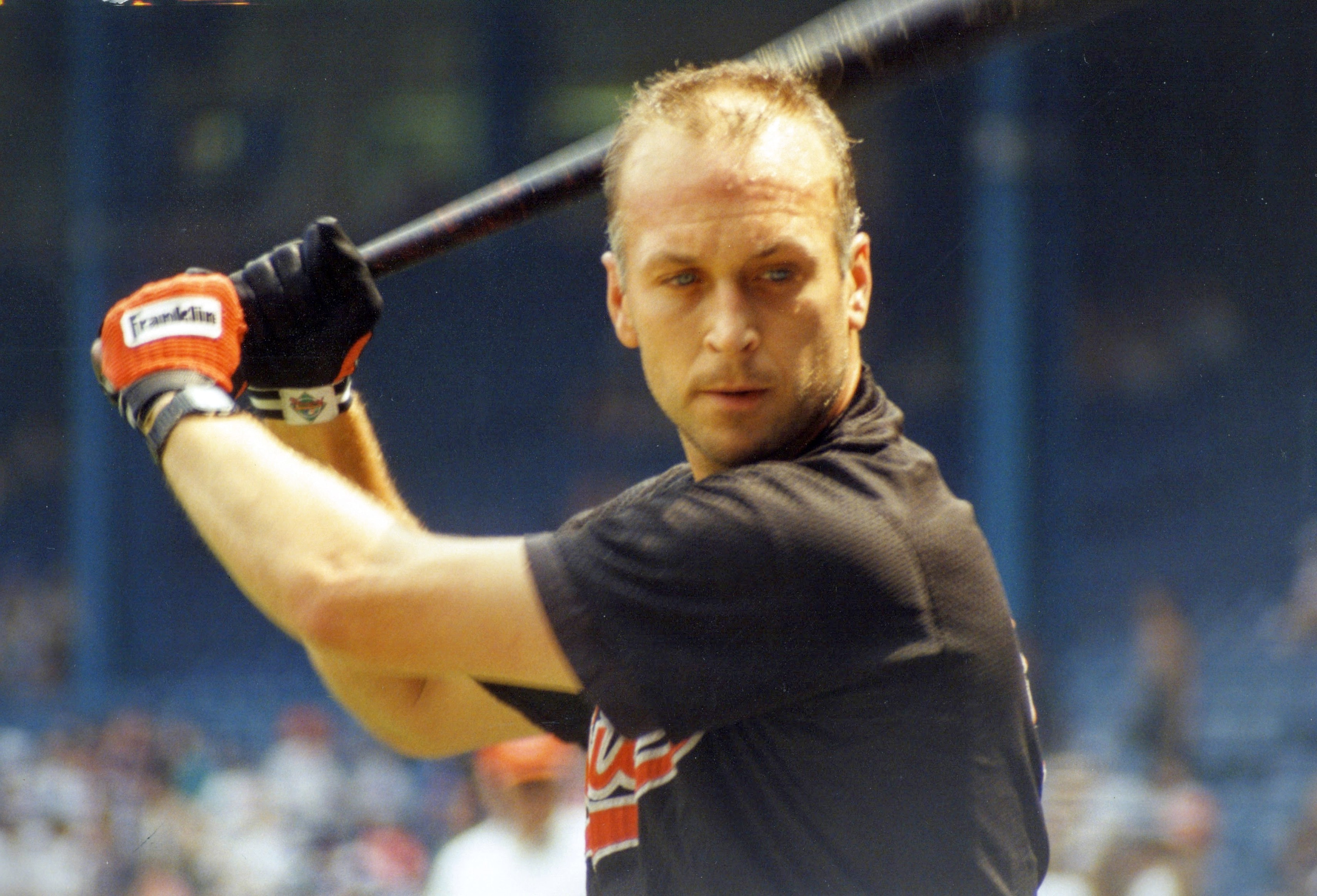
Cal Ripken Jr., native of Havre de Grace, Maryland

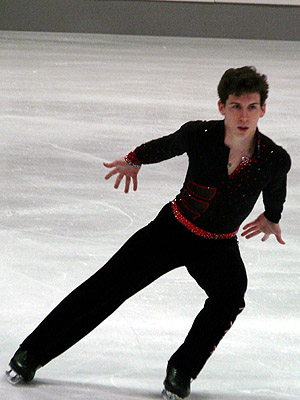
Shaun Rogers, native of Baltimore, Maryland

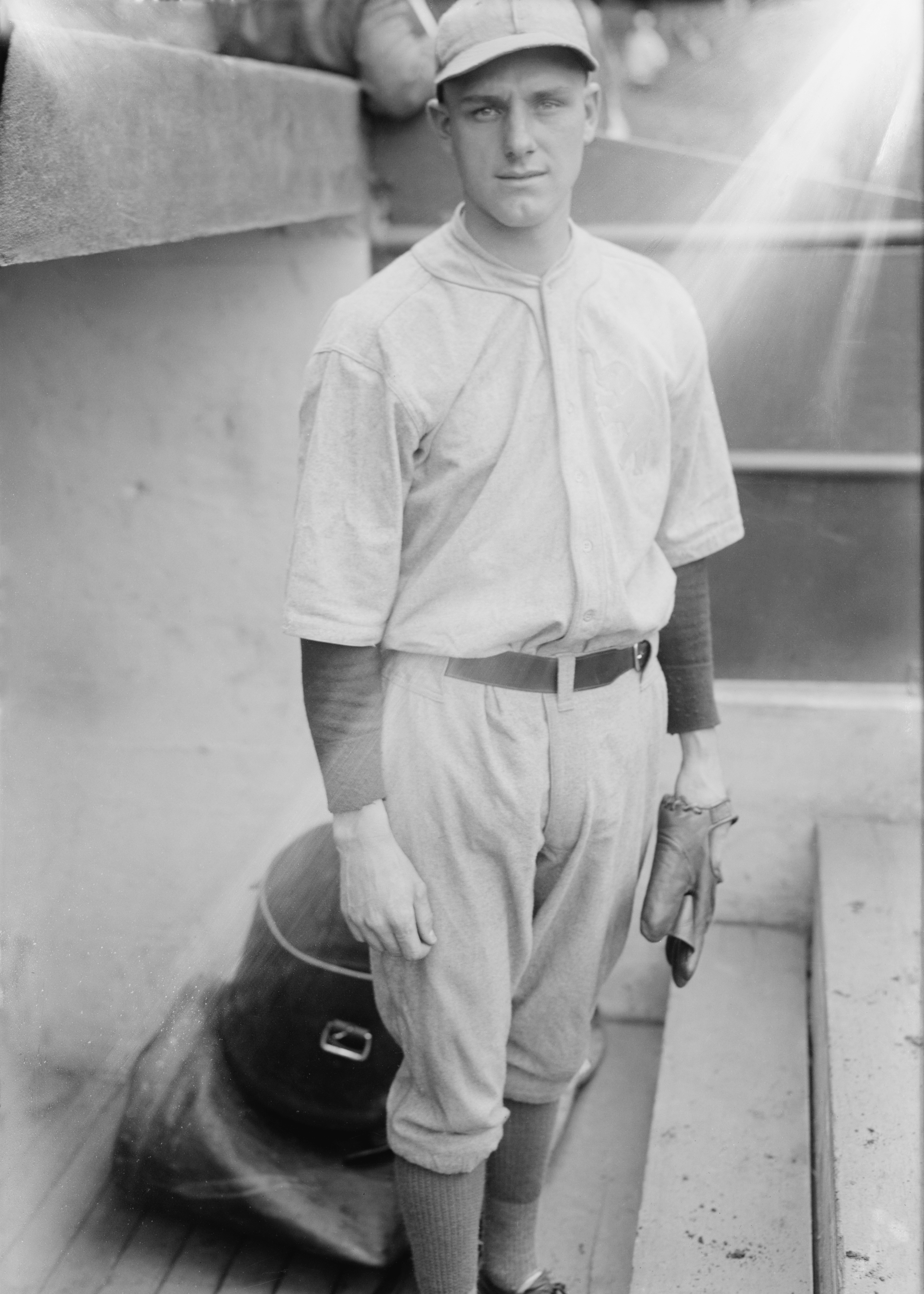
Eddie Rommel, native of Baltimore, Maryland

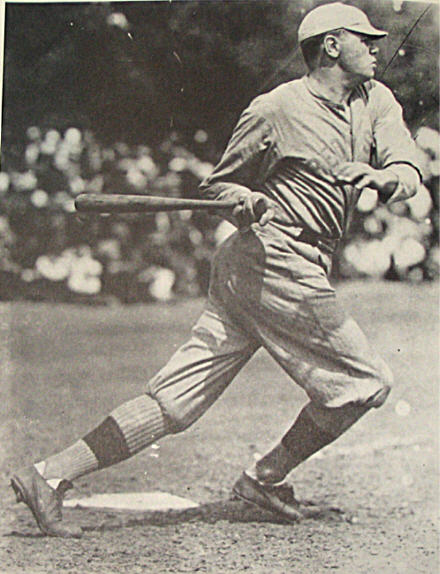
Babe Ruth, native of Baltimore, Maryland

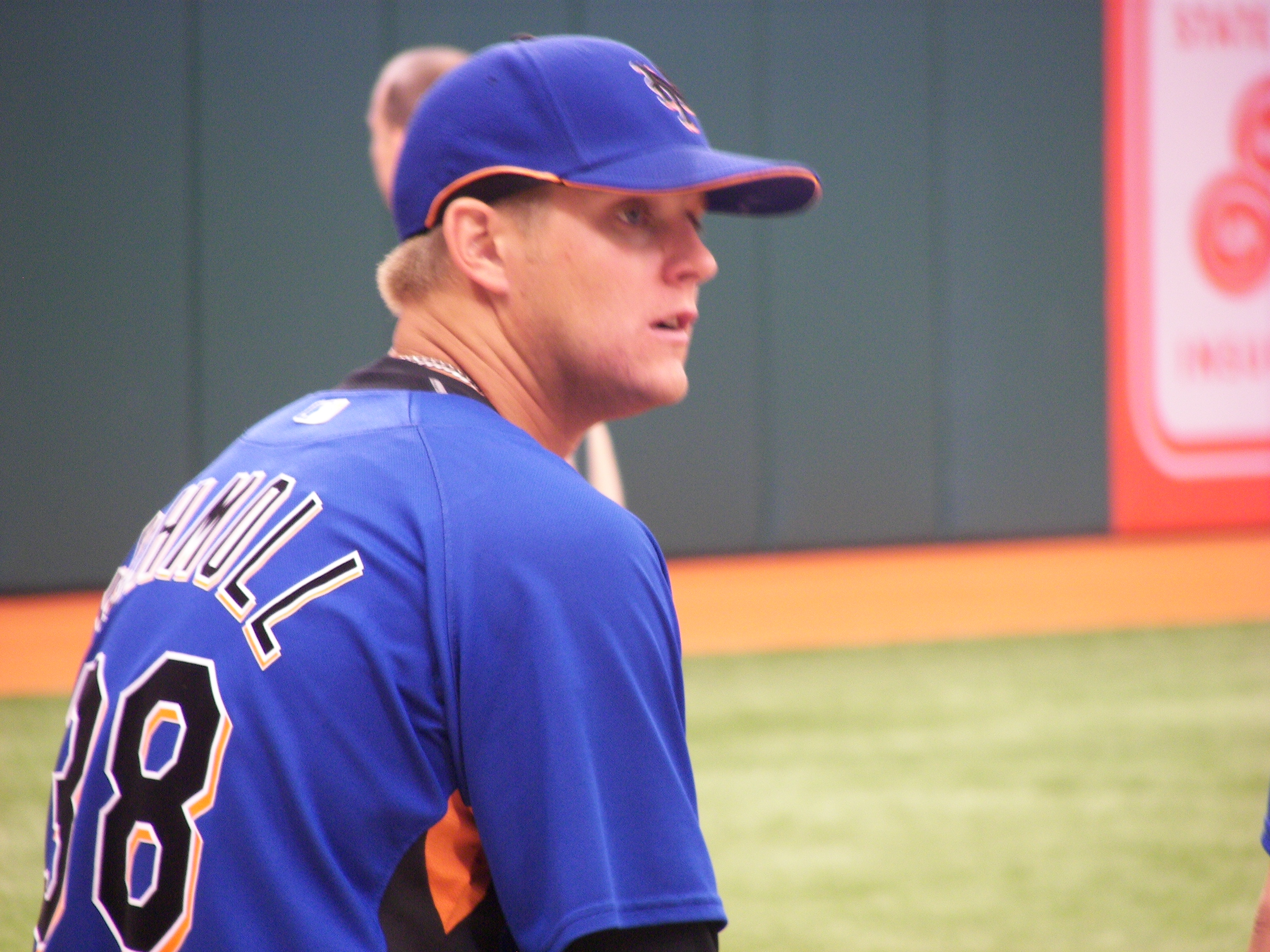
Steve Schmoll, native of Silver Spring, Maryland

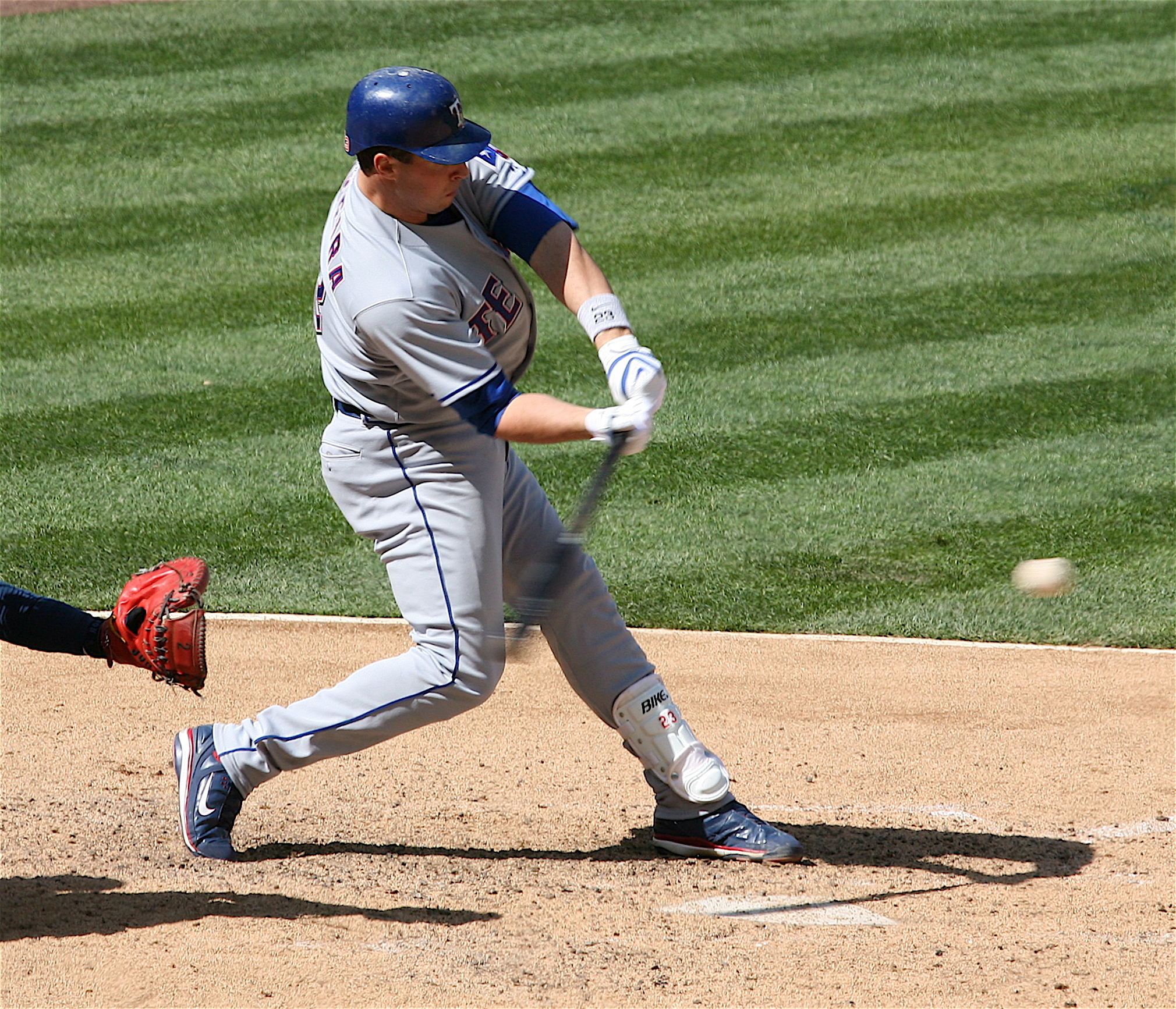
Mark Teixeira, native of Annapolis, Maryland

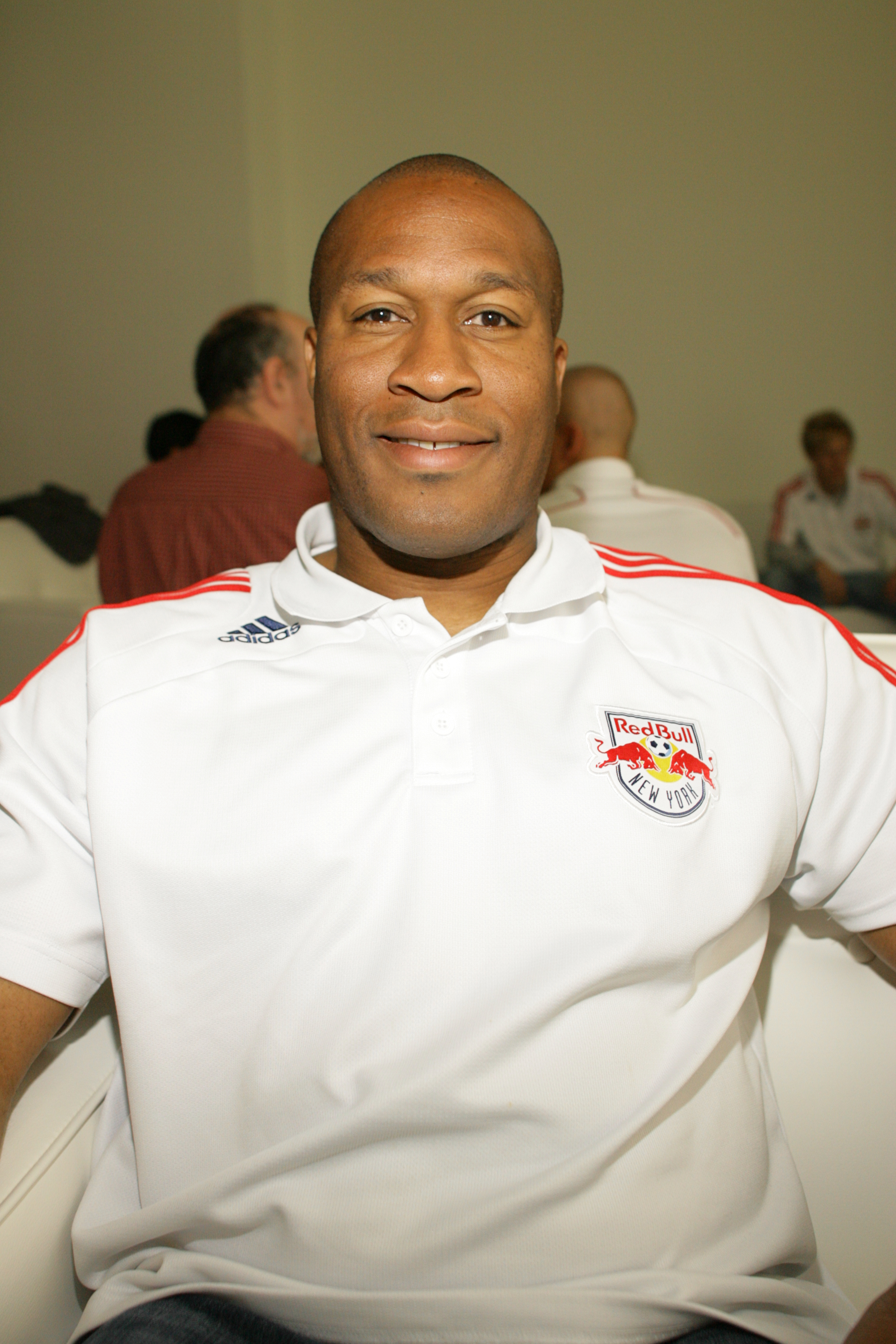
Zach Thornton, native of Edgewood, Maryland

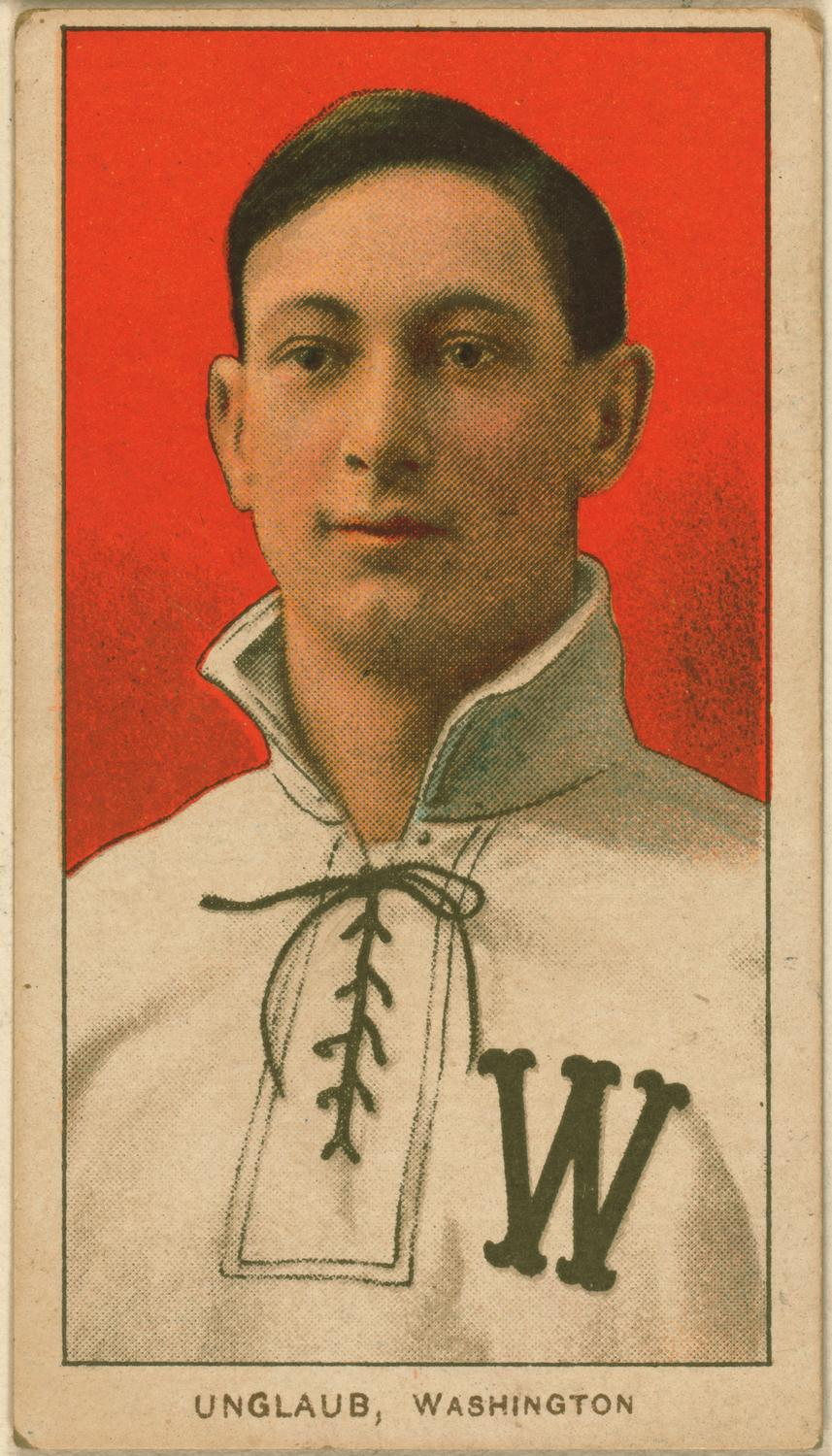
Bob Unglaub, native of Baltimore, Maryland

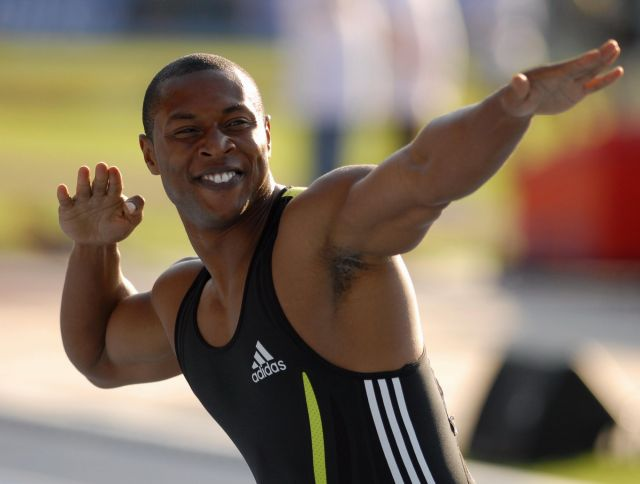
Bernard Williams, native of Baltimore, Maryland

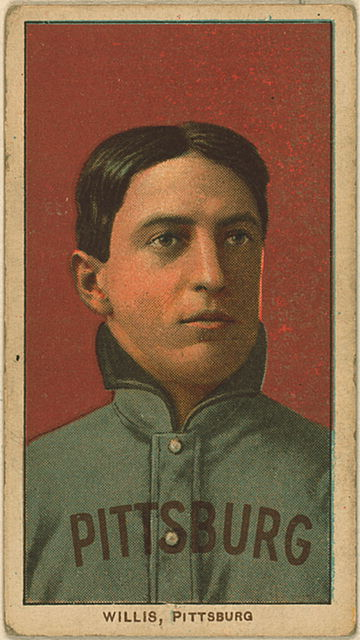
Vic Willis, native of Cecil County, Maryland

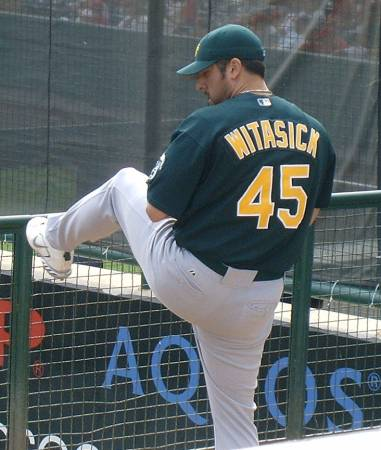
Jay Witasick, native of Baltimore, Maryland

Name	Sport	Professional years	Hometown	Notes	Ref
== N ==
Shawn Nadelen	Lacrosse	2001–present	Baltimore		
Denny Neagle	Baseball	1989–2003	Gambrills		
Gary Neal	Basketball	2007–present	Baltimore		
Bob Nelson	American football	1986–1990	Baltimore		
Jeff Nelson	Baseball	1984–2006	Baltimore		
Johnny Neun	Baseball	1925–1931	Baltimore		
Simon Nicholls	Baseball	1903–1910	Germantown		
Bill Nicholson	Baseball	1936–1953	Chestertown		
Chad Nkang	American football	2007–present	Hyattsville		
Nick Noble	Soccer	2005–present	Damascus		
George Nock	American football	1969–1972	Baltimore		
Tim Nordbrook	Baseball	1974–1980	Baltimore		
Emory Nusz	Baseball	1884	Rockville		
== O ==
Quinn Ojinnaka	American football	2006	Seabrook		
Red Oldham	Baseball	1914–1926	Zion		
Wesley Oler	Track	1912	Baltimore		
Jim Ostendarp	American football	1950–1951	Baltimore		
Fred Ostendorf	Baseball	1914	Baltimore		
== P ==
Irv Pankey	American football	1980–1992	Aberdeen		
James Parrish	American football	1993–1995	Baltimore		
Frank Parsons Jr.	Shooting	1948	Baltimore		
Al Pastrana	American football	1969–1970	Annapolis		
Suzanne Paxton	Fencing	1996	Baltimore		
Clint Peay	Soccer	1996–2000	Columbia		
Cecil Perkins	Baseball	1967	Baltimore		
Sam Perlozzo	Baseball	1977–1981	Cumberland		
Julian Peterson	American football	2000–present	Temple Hills	First round draft pick in 2000 NFL draft	
Babe Phelps	Baseball	1931–1942	Odenton		
Michael Phelps	Swimming	2004, 2008	Baltimore	22-time Swimming Olympic gold medalist	
Tom Phoebus	Baseball	1960–1972	Baltimore	1966 The Sporting News MLB Rookie of the Year	
Maury Pierce	Baseball	1884			
Charlie Pittman	American football	1970–1971	Baltimore		
Mike Pitts	American football	1983–1994	Baltimore	First round draft pick in 1983 NFL draft	
Dave Pivec	American football	1966–1969	Baltimore		
Boots Poffenberger	Baseball	1937–1939	Williamsport		
Frank Pollack	American football	1991–1997	Camp Springs		
Tommy Polley	American football	2001–2006	Baltimore		
George Popplein	Baseball	1873	Baltimore		
Chuck Porter	Baseball	1976–1986	Baltimore		
Dick Porter	Baseball	1929–1934	Princess Anne		
Jake Powell	Baseball	1930–1945	Silver Spring		
Ike Powers	Baseball	1927–1928	Hancock		
Warren Powers	American football	1989–1993	Baltimore		
Guy Prather	American football	1981–1985	Gaithersburg		
Bill Pritchard	American football	1927–1928	Frostburg		
Jim Proctor	Baseball	1959	Brandywine		
== Q ==
Dwight Muhammad Qawi	Boxing	1978–1999	Baltimore		
Santino Quaranta	Soccer	2001–present	Baltimore		
Eddie Quick	Baseball	1903	Baltimore		
Tom Quinn	Baseball	1886–1890	Annapolis		
== R ==
Paul Rabil	Lacrosse	2008–present	Gaithersburg	2007 McLaughlin Award winner	
Nick Rassas	American football	1966–1968	Baltimore		
Don Ratliff	American football	1966–1968	Baltimore		
Mike Reichenbach	American football	1984–1991	Fort Meade		
Matthew Rice	American football	2006–2007	Greenbelt		
Dorsey Riddlemoser	Baseball	1899	Frederick		
Billy Ripken	Baseball	1982–1998	Havre de Grace		
Cal Ripken Jr.	Baseball	1978–2001	Havre de Grace	* AL Rookie of the Year in 1982 * 2-time AL MVP in 1983 and 1991 * Inducted into National Baseball Hall of Fame in 2007	
Bob Robertson	Baseball	1964–1979	Frostburg		
Dick Robertson	Baseball	1913–1919	Rockville		
Lybrant Robinson	American football	1989	Salisbury		
Doug Roby	American football	1923	Port Tobacco		
Josh Roenicke	Baseball	2006–present	Baltimore		
Shaun Rogers	Figure skating	2006–present	Baltimore		
Eddie Rommel	Baseball	1920–1932	Baltimore		
Al Rubeling	Baseball	1940–1944	Baltimore		
Ben Rubeor	Lacrosse	Baltimore	2009–present		
Don Rudolph	Baseball	1957–1964	Baltimore		
Allen Russell	Baseball	1915–1925	Baltimore		
Lefty Russell	Baseball	1910–1912	Baltimore		
Babe Ruth	Baseball	1914–1935	Baltimore	* AL MVP in 1923 * Inducted into National Baseball Hall of Fame in 1936	
== S ==
Tony Saunders	Baseball	1992–2005	Baltimore		
Jimmy Say	Baseball	1882–1887	Baltimore		
Lou Say	Baseball	1871–1884	Baltimore		
Jack Scarbath	American football	1953–1956	Baltimore	* First round draft pick in 1953 NFL draft * Inducted into the College Football Hall of Fame in 1983	
Nick Scharf	Baseball	1882–1883	Baltimore		
Greg Schaum	American football	1976–1978	Baltimore		
Jim Schelle	Baseball	1939	Baltimore		
Mike Schemer	Baseball	1945–1946	Baltimore		
Butch Schmidt	Baseball	1909–1915	Baltimore		
Steve Schmoll	Baseball	2002–present	Silver Spring		
Bill Schroeder	Baseball	1979–1990	Baltimore		
Jody Schulz	American football	1983–1987	Chester		
Brad Schumacher	Swimming	1996	Bowie	1996 Olympic gold medalist	
Jesse Schwartzman	Lacrosse	2007–present	Owings Mills		
Dennis Scott	Basketball	1990–2000	Hagerstown	First round draft pick in 1990 NBA draft	
Tom Scott	American football	1953–1964	Baltimore	Inducted into the College Football Hall of Fame in 1979	
Tom Seabron	American football	1979–1980	Baltimore		
Kurt Seibert	Baseball	1978–1981	Cheverly		
Ted Sepkowski	Baseball	1942–1947	Baltimore		
Kevin Shaffer	American football	2002–present	Salisbury		
Sam Shaw	Baseball	1888–1893	Baltimore		
Barry Shetrone	Baseball	1959–1963	Baltimore		
J. P. Shilling	Speed skating	2002	Baltimore		
Roger Shoals	American football	1961–1971	Baltimore		
Pam Shriver	Tennis	1979–1997	Baltimore	1988 Tennis Olympic gold medalist	
Gene Shue	Basketball	1954–1964	Baltimore		
Dickey Simpkins	Basketball	1994–2006	Fort Washington		
Josh Sims	Lacrosse	2002–present	Annapolis		
Keith Sims	American football	1990–2000	Baltimore		
Tal Skinner	Basketball	1974–1976	Berlin		
Walt Smallwood	Baseball	1917–1919	Dayton		
Bill Smiley	Baseball	1882	Baltimore		
Daryl Smith	Baseball	1980–1995	Baltimore		
Greg Smith	Baseball	1985–1995	Baltimore		
Harry Smith	Baseball	1914–1918	Baltimore		
Homer Smoot	Baseball	1900–1912	Galestown		
Charlie Snell	Baseball	1912	Hampstead		
Ray Snell	American football	1980–1985	Baltimore	First round draft pick in 1980 NFL draft	
Harold Solomon	Tennis	1952	Silver Spring	#5 in world	
Ron Solt	American football	1984–1991	Bainbridge	First round draft pick in 1984 NFL draft	
Ben Spencer	Baseball	1913	Patapsco		
Akhnaten Spencer-El	Fencing	2000	Baltimore		
George Spriggs	Baseball	1963–1970	Jewell		
Larry Spriggs	Basketball	1981–1986	Cheverly		
Rick Steirer	Baseball	1977–1986	Baltimore		
Garrett Stephenson	Baseball	1992–2003	Takoma Park		
Bobby Stevens	Baseball	1931	Chevy Chase		
Jim Stevens	Baseball	1914	Williamsburg		
Archie Stimmel	Baseball	1900–1902	Woodsboro		
Robert Stinson	Sailing	1956	Baltimore		
Otis Stocksdale	Baseball	1893–1896	Arcadia		
Art Stokes	Baseball	1925	Emmitsburg		
Mike Stonebreaker	American football	1991–1994	Baltimore		
Bill Stumpf	Baseball	1912–1913	Baltimore		
Jill Sudduth	Synchronised swimming	1996	Baltimore	1996 Olympic gold medalist	
Suter Sullivan	Baseball	1898–1899	Baltimore		
Ivory Sully	American football	1979–1987	Salisbury		
Larry Surock	Soccer	1952	Baltimore	Inducted into Maryland Soccer Hall of Fame in 1991	
Ron Swoboda	Baseball	1964–1973	Baltimore		
John Sykes	American football	1972	Baltimore		
== T ==
Jack Taylor	Baseball	1891–1899	Sandy Hill		
Pete Taylor	Baseball	1952	Severn		
Jim Teal	American football	1973	Baltimore		
Mark Teixeira	Baseball	2002–present	Annapolis	First round draft pick in 2001 MLB draft	
Tommy Thomas	Baseball	1926–1937	Baltimore		
Daryl Thompson	Baseball	2003–present	La Plata		
Kevin Thompson	American football	2000–2007	Gaithersburg		
Ryan Thompson	Baseball	1987–2004	Chestertown		
Zach Thornton	Soccer	1996–present	Edgewood		
Lou Thuman	Baseball	1939–1940	Baltimore		
Calvin Tiggle	American football	1991–2001	Fort Washington		
Frank Todd	Baseball	1898	Aberdeen		
Randy Tomlin	Baseball	1988–1996	Bainbridge		
Marco Tongue	American football	1983–1984	Annapolis		
Reggie Tongue	American football	1996–2005	Baltimore		
Steve Trimble	American football	1981–1987	Cumberland		
Sam Trott	Baseball	1880–1888			
John Turnbull	Field hockey	1936	Baltimore		
== U ==
Maury Uhler	Baseball	1914	Pikesville		
Dutch Ulrich	Baseball	1925–1927	Baltimore		
Bob Unglaub	Baseball	1904–1910	Baltimore		
Pong Unitas	American football	1921	Baltimore		
== V ==
Mike Venafro	Baseball	1995–2007	Takoma Park		
Tommy Vereker	Baseball	1915	Baltimore		
== W ==
Paul Wachtel	Baseball	1917–1930	Myersville	Member of the Texas League Hall of Fame	
Bob Wade	American football	1968–1970	Baltimore		
Shatori Walker-Kimbrough	Basketball			Player for the Israeli team Maccabi Bnot Ashdod, and the Washington Mystics of the Women's National Basketball Association	
Doc Wallace	Baseball	1919	Church Hill		
Jim Ward	American football	1967–1971	Frederick		
Chris Warren	American football	1990–2000	Silver Spring		
Dante Washington	Soccer	1992–2005	Baltimore		
Steve Watson	American football	1979–1987	Baltimore	Inducted into Delaware Sports Museum and Hall of Fame in 1993	
Larry Webster	American football	1992–2002	Elkton		
Marvin Webster	Basketball	1975–1987	Baltimore	First round draft pick in 1975 NBA draft	
Billy Werber	Baseball	1930–1942	Berwyn Heights		
Drew Westervelt	Lacrosse	2007–present	Bel Air		
Bob Wheeler	Track	1972	Baltimore		
Ruth White	Fencing	1972	Baltimore		
Spider Wilhelm	Baseball	1953	Baltimore		
Bernard Williams	Track	2000, 2004	Baltimore	2000 Olympic gold medalist	
Bob Williams	American football	1951–1955	Cumberland	*First round draft pick in 1951 NFL draft * Inducted into the College Football Hall of Fame in 1988	
Brooks Williams	American football	1978–1983	Baltimore		
Calvin Williams	American football	1990–1996	Baltimore		
Derrick Williams	American football	2009–present	Greenbelt		
Mark Williams	American football	1994–1996	Camp Springs		
Reggie Williams	Basketball	1987–1996	Baltimore	First round draft pick in 1987 NBA draft	
Vic Willis	Baseball	1898–1910	Cecil County	Inducted into National Baseball Hall of Fame in 1995	
Craig Wilson	Baseball	1984–1995	Annapolis		
Gary Wilson	Baseball	1902	Baltimore		
Henry Wilson	Baseball	1898	Baltimore		
Walter Wilson	American football	1990–1992	Baltimore		
Wayne Wilson	American football	1979–1987	Montgomery County		
Kennard Winchester	Basketball	1990–1993	Chestertown		
David Wingate	Basketball	1986–2000	Baltimore		
Elmer Wingate	American football	1953	Baltimore		
Skip Wise	Basketball	1974–1976	Baltimore		
Danny Wiseman	Professional bowling	1987–present	Baltimore	Professional Bowlers Association HOF 2013	
Jay Witasick	Baseball	1993–2007	Baltimore		
Raymond Wittelsberger	Field hockey	1956	Baltimore		
Johnnie Wittig	Baseball	1938–1949	Baltimore		
Jason Wolfe	Ice hockey	1998–present	College Park		
Donnell Woolford	American football	1989–1999	Baltimore	First round draft pick in 1989 NFL draft	
Harry Worthington	Track	1912	Baltimore		
Chuck Wortman	Baseball	1916–1918	Baltimore		
== X–Y ==
Ryan Yarborough	American football	1994–2001	Baltimore		
Charlie Yingling	Baseball	1894	Baltimore		
Joe Yingling	Baseball	1886	Baltimore		
Bobby Young	Baseball	1948–1958	Granite		
Chase Young	American football	2020–present	Upper Marlboro		
Perry Young	Basketball	1986–1987	Baltimore		
== Z ==
Katie Zaferes	Triathlete	2005–present	Hampstead		
Geoff Zahn	Baseball	1968–1985	Baltimore		
Joanna Zeiger	Triathlete	2000–present	Baltimore		

== See also ==
- List of people from Maryland#Athletes
- Sports in Maryland
- Maryland#Sports
