= Ben Spencer =

Ben Spencer may refer to:

- Ben Spencer (baseball) (1890–1970), American baseball outfielder
- Ben Spencer (rugby union) (born 1992), English rugby union player
- Ben Spencer (soccer) (born 1995), American soccer player
- Ben Spencer (politician) (born 1981), British MP elected 2019
