= List of sports venues in Maryland =

The following table lists sports venues in Maryland which are in current use.

Venue	City/town	Current tenants	Seating capacity	Year opened	Ref
Pimlico Race Course	Baltimore	N/A	109,748	1870	
Commanders Field	Landover	Washington Commanders	62,000	1997	
M&T Bank Stadium	Baltimore	Baltimore Ravens	70,745	1998	
SECU Stadium	College Park	Maryland Terrapins	51,802	1950	
Oriole Park at Camden Yards	Baltimore	Baltimore Orioles	44,970	1992	
Navy–Marine Corps Memorial Stadium	Annapolis	Navy Midshipmen; Annapolis Blues FC	34,000	1959	
Xfinity Center	College Park	Maryland Terrapins	17,950	2002	
Laurel Park Racecourse	Laurel	N/A	15,105	1911	
CFG Bank Arena	Baltimore		14,000	1962	
Johnny Unitas Stadium	Towson	Towson Tigers	11,198	1978	
Hughes Stadium	Baltimore	Morgan State Bears	10,001	1937	
Homewood Field	Baltimore	Johns Hopkins Blue Jays	8,500	1906	
Adventure Sports Center International	McHenry	N/A	N/A	2007	
Alumni Hall	Annapolis	Navy Midshipmen	6,500	1991	
Arthur W. Perdue Stadium	Salisbury	Delmarva Shorebirds	5,200	1996	
Dickerson Whitewater Course	Dickerson	N/A	N/A	1991	
Glenn Warner Soccer Facility	Annapolis	Navy Midshipmen	1,600	2001	
Greenway Avenue Stadium	Cumberland	N/A	6,054	1930s	
Harry Grove Stadium	Frederick	Frederick Keys; Spire City Ghost Hounds	5,400	1990	
Hytche Athletic Center	Princess Anne	Maryland Eastern Shore Hawks	5,500	2000	
John B. Schuerholz Baseball Complex	Towson	Towson Tigers	500	2001	
Knott Arena	Emmitsburg	Mount Saint Mary's Mountaineers	3,000	1987	
Ludwig Field	College Park	Maryland Terrapins	7,000	1995	
Maryland SoccerPlex	Germantown	Maryland Bobcats FC; Old Glory DC	5,000	2000	
Physical Education Complex	Baltimore	Coppin State Eagles	4,100	2009	
Prince George's Stadium	Bowie	Bowie Baysox	10,000	1994	
Regency Furniture Stadium	Waldorf	Southern Maryland Blue Crabs	4,200	2008	
Reitz Arena	Baltimore	Loyola Greyhounds	2,100	1984	
Leidos Field at Ripken Stadium	Aberdeen	Aberdeen IronBirds	6,300	2002	
Bob "Turtle" Smith Stadium	College Park	Maryland Terrapins	2,500	1965	
Show Place Arena	Upper Marlboro		5,800	1993	
Talmadge L. Hill Field House	Baltimore	Morgan State Bears	4,250	1974	
Towson Center	Towson	Towson Tigers	5,000 (arena); 200 (softball complex); 500 (soccer complex)	1976	
TU Arena	Towson	Towson Tigers; Baltimore Blast	5,200	2013	
Chesapeake Employers Insurance Arena	Catonsville	UMBC Retrievers	5,000	2018	
UMBC Stadium	Catonsville	UMBC Retrievers	4,500	1976	
