= Calverton School =

The Calverton School
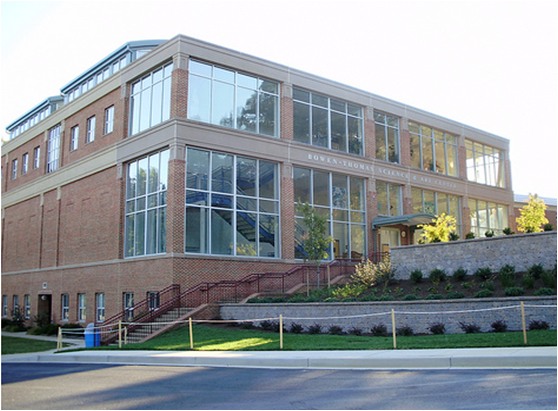
- Huntingtown, Maryland; USA

Information
- Type: Private (non-religious, co-ed, boarding)
- Established: 1967
- Locale: Built on 159 acres of land
- Head of School: Adrienne Forgette
- Grades: Preschool-12th grade
- Enrollment: 345
- Colors: Blue and Gray
- Athletics: Lacrosse, Golf, Soccer, Tennis, Basketball, Cross-Country, Volleyball, Swim, Track
- Mascot: Cougar
- Website: http://www.calvertonschool.org/

The Calverton School is a college preparatory, private, day and boarding school located in Huntingtown, Maryland, approximately 45 minutes east of Washington, D.C., and 30 minutes south of Annapolis, Maryland.

They currently enroll 345 students beginning in Preschool through Grade 12. Day students come from five counties, including Calvert, Charles, St. Mary's, Anne Arundel, and Prince George's. Bus transportation stops in Calvert, Charles, Anne Arundel and Prince Georgie's counties. The school includes the main building in which Upper (High) and Middle school are located, a recently built complex for the Lower School, a main office, which is the original building, a gym, and the only turf field in Calvert County. Calverton's Extended Day Program offers an extension of the school day. In September 2014, the school opened its One World Residential Village, allowing the school to expand its high school boarding program.

== Accreditation ==
The Calverton School is accredited by the following associations:

- National Association of Independent Schools
- Association of Independent Maryland Schools
- Maryland State Department of Education
