= Patapsco, Carroll County, Maryland =

Unincorporated community in Maryland, United States

Patapsco, Maryland
- Unincorporated community
- Location within the state of Maryland Patapsco (the United States)
- Coordinates: 39°32′19″N 76°53′31″W
- Country: United States
- State: Maryland
- County: Caroll
- Time zone: UTC-5 (Eastern (EST))
  - Summer (DST): UTC-4 (EDT)

Patapsco is an unincorporated community in Carroll County, Maryland, United States, in the Baltimore metropolitan area.

Major League Baseball player Ben Spencer was born in Patapsco.
