= St. Mary's High School (Annapolis, Maryland) =

Private school in Annapolis, Maryland, United States

St. Mary's School
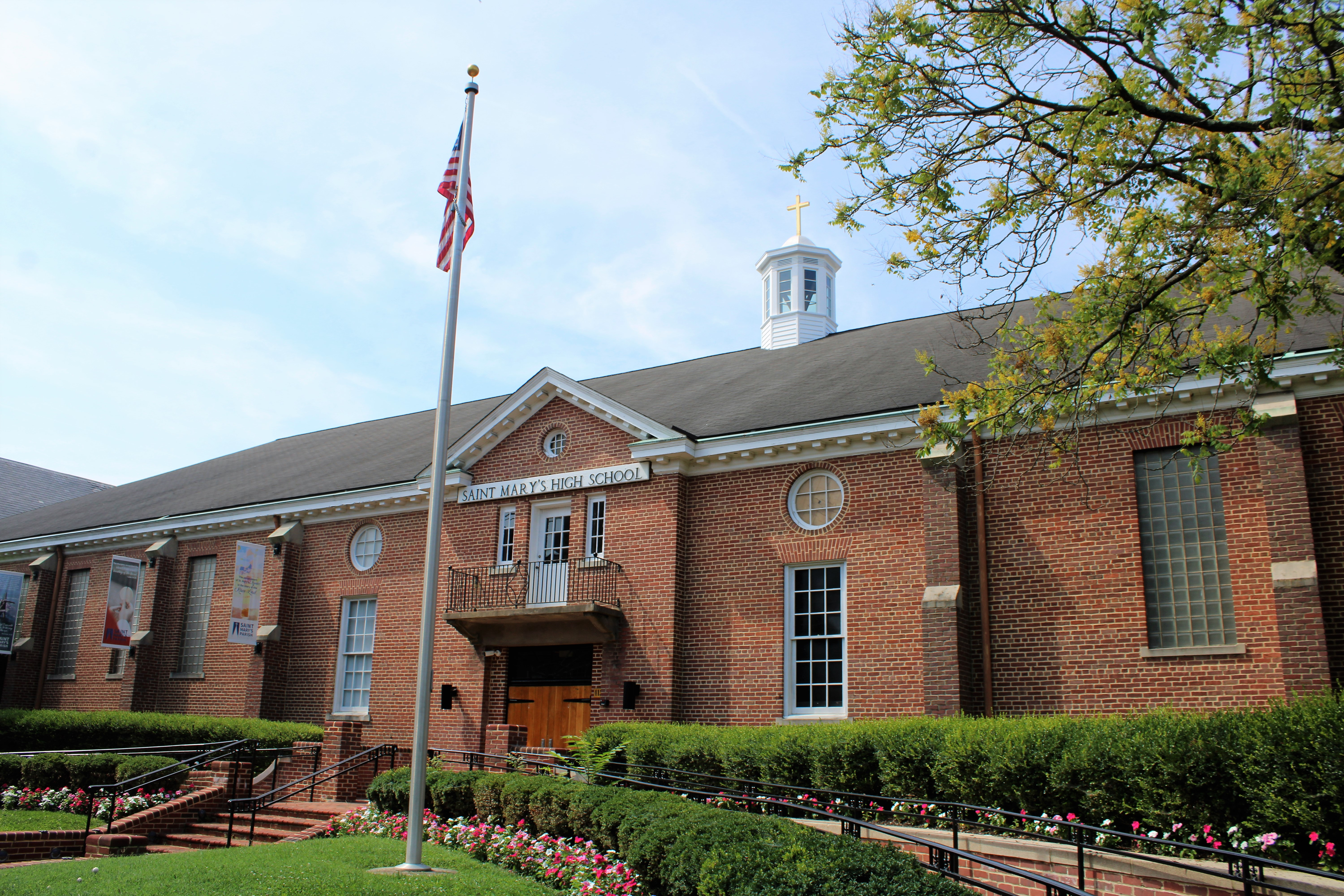

Location
- 113 Duke of Gloucester Street; Annapolis, Maryland 21401; United States; 38°58′30″N 76°29′18″W

Information
- Type: Private
- Motto: Faith, Tradition, Excellence
- Religious affiliation: Roman Catholic
- Established: 1946
- School code: 210008
- Principal: Melissa Nisbett (High School); Megan Back (Elementary)
- Chaplain: Patrick Woods
- Teaching staff: 34.0 (FTE)
- Grades: Pre-K–12
- Gender: Coeducational
- Enrollment: 500 (2013-2014)
- Student to teacher ratio: 14.7
- Campus type: Urban
- Colors: Royal Blue and White
- Athletics: 14 Sports; 19 Teams
- Athletics conference: MIAA (boys); IAAM (girls)
- Nickname: Saints
- Rival: Severn School
- Accreditation: AdvancED; Middle States Association of Colleges and Schools
- Publication: Soundings (literary magazine)
- Newspaper: The Crabnet
- Yearbook: Marilogue
- Feeder schools: St. Mary's Elementary School, Annapolis
- Website: www.stmarysannapolis.org/school/academics/high-school
- [4]  [5]

St. Mary's School is a private, coeducational, Catholic school serving grades Pre-K–12 in downtown Annapolis, Maryland. It is part of the Roman Catholic Archdiocese of Baltimore. St. Mary's is accredited by AdvancED, the Archdiocese of Baltimore, and is recognized and approved by the Maryland State Department of Education.

== Administration ==
As of 2025, the leadership team includes High School Principal Melissa Nisbett and Elementary Principal Megan Back.

== History ==
St. Mary's High School is co-located with its affiliated parish church St. Mary's Church and elementary school. The church and parish itself date back to 1853 with the arrival of the Redemptorists in Baltimore. St. Mary's School (elementary) was founded in 1862 and the high school was added in 1946.

== Demographics ==
The demographic breakdown of the 479 students enrolled in 2017-2018 was:

- Native American/Alaskan - 0.2%
- Asian/Pacific islanders - 1.4%
- African American - 3%
- Hispanic - 3.2%
- White - 85.1%
- Multiracial - 7%

== Campus features ==
The school is located in downtown Annapolis on Duke of Gloucester Street. It is connected by a hallway and outdoor walkway with St. Mary's Elementary School, with whom it also shares a library building, and shares its grounds with St. Mary's Church as well as the Charles Carroll House, the historic home of Charles Carroll of Annapolis. Originally, the School Sisters of Notre Dame maintained a convent on the property; that building has since been transformed primarily into a library and computer labs. Classrooms and hallways are based on a traditional corridor basis (A, B, and C), with lockers located in each along the walls. The gymnasium is named after C. Mason "Daffy" Russell, a longtime coach at St. Mary's.

Being located in a dense, urban area and surrounded by historic properties, the school does not have athletic fields of its own on campus. Historically, the school has utilized practice facilities at Bates Middle School and Germantown Elementary School for practices and used various sites in the area for home games. In 2007, St. Mary's gained its own home field by building the St. Mary's Field at St. John Neumann Church on Bestgate Road, approximately 2 miles (3.2 km) from campus.

== Academics ==
St. Mary's offers AP and Honors classes for advanced students. In 2016, St. Mary's immersed their student body and faculty with a 1:1 iPad program. A program offered at the high school is their St. Isidore Cyber Program, designated for students interested in a STEM-based program of study and internship, designed to develop student proficiency and exploration in the areas of science, technology, engineering, and math.

== Student life ==
The school newspaper is The Crabnet, and St. Mary's has a total of 25 clubs, including a sailing team, Model UN, and a variety of others. Campus ministry is a big component of student life. Each year, students must attend a retreat. Their senior year, the students participated in Kairos.

== Athletics ==
The school's main rival is the Severn School. They play lacrosse in a match called "Battle Lax" and football in a game called "The River Classic."

St. Mary's participates in the Maryland Interscholastic Athletic Association (MIAA), primarily in boy's athletics, and the Interscholastic Athletic Association of Maryland (IAAM), primarily in girl's athletics. The school fields the following sports:

=== Fall ===
Cross Country (Varsity - Boys), Cross Country (Varsity - Girls), Field Hockey (Junior Varsity & Varsity - Girls), Football (JV & Varsity - Boys), Soccer (JV & Varsity - Boys), Soccer (JV & Varsity - Girls), Volleyball (JV & Varsity - Girls).

=== Winter ===
Basketball (JV & Varsity - Boys), Basketball (JV & Varsity - Girls), Ice Hockey (Varsity - Boys), Swimming (Varsity - Boys), Swimming (Varsity - Girls), Wrestling (Varsity - Boys).

=== Spring ===
Baseball (JV & Varsity - Boys), Lacrosse (Freshman/Sophomore, JV, & Varsity - Boys), Lacrosse (FR/SO, JV, & Varsity - Girls), Golf (Varsity - Boys & Girls), Tennis (Varsity - Boys & Girls), Track (Varsity Boys), Track (Varsity Girls).

== Notable alumni ==
- Robert C. Baldwin, Maryland Delegate
- Michael E. Busch, former Speaker of the Maryland House of Delegates
- Chuck Bresnahan, former defensive coordinator for the Cincinnati Bengals
- Henry Ciccarone, Hall of Fame lacrosse coach for Johns Hopkins
- John Dorsey, NFL executive and former player
- Chris Garrity, professional lacrosse player
- Joshua Grannell, actor, filmmaker, and drag queen known as Peaches Christ
- Terry Hutchinson, sailor
- Peter Oakley, Senator from Maryland

== See also ==
- National Catholic Educational Association
