= Dr. Samuel L. Banks High School =

Location
- 5001 Sinclair Lane; Baltimore, Maryland 21206; United States; 39°19′10.3″N 76°32′43.7″W

Information
- School type: Defunct, Public, Comprehensive
- Motto: "A College Preparatory Learning Community Focused on Research & Technology"
- Founded: 2003
- Closed: 2009
- School district: Baltimore City Public Schools
- School number: 420
- Grades: 9-12
- Enrollment: 561 (2008)
- Area: Urban
- Colors: Black and Gold
- Mascot: Lion

Dr. Samuel L. Banks High School was a public secondary school in Baltimore, Maryland, United States. It was part of the small schools initiative in order to consolidate larger schools into smaller learning environments.

== Recent move ==
In the 2006–2007 school year a number of BCPSS schools were shut down and forcibly relocated into different buildings or to close down completely due to the condition of some buildings. Dr. Samuel L. Banks High School was one of them. The school moved to 5001 Sinclair Lane from 2500 E. Northern Parkway. They moved into the building that was once occupied by Thurgood Marshall Middle School, while that school moved into portable buildings and phased out. Dr. Samuel L. Banks High School shared a campus with another high school, Thurgood Marshall High School. In its first year at the new location, the school's enrollment was 735; this decreased significantly to 561 during the next school year. Baltimore City Public Schools determined the school would close for good after the 2008 school year.

== Demographics and enrollment ==
Year	Enrollment	% African- American	% White	% Hispanic	% Asian/Pacific Islander	% American Indian/Native Alaskan
2007–2008	561	518	5	4	1	1
2006–2007	735	650	10	5	4	2
2005–2006	658	553	20	6	5	0
2004–2005	433	385	20	2	1	0
2003–2004	256	222	29	2	1	2

ATTENDANCE RATE

2007 83.5%

2006 85.5%

2005 73.1%

2004 85.7%

2003 83.3%

GRADUATION RATE

2008 94.4%

2007 60.98%

2006 77.36%

2005 72.41%
