= Salisbury Reds (baseball) =

Minor league baseball team

The Salisbury Reds were an Interstate League baseball team based in Salisbury, Maryland, that played during the 1952 season replacing the Salisbury A's that had played in the league the year before. They were managed by Mike Blazo and Dick Porter and went 65–73.

Ducky Detweiler and Maurice Fisher played for them.
