= Our Lady of Mount Carmel School (Essex, Maryland) =

Location
- 1704 Old Eastern Avenue; Essex, (Baltimore County), Maryland 21221-2203; United States
- Coordinates: 39°19′14″N 76°26′56″W

Information
- Type: Private, Coeducational, K-12 Archdiocese of Baltimore
- Religious affiliation: Roman Catholic
- Established: 1927 (School)
- President: Dr. Mindi Imes
- Principal: Jennifer Leynes and James Nemeth
- Faculty: 73
- Grades: Pre-K – 12th Grade
- Average class size: 20
- Colors: Blue and White
- Sports: 6 Men's varsity, 6 Women's varsity, 1 co-ed Varsity
- Mascot: Cougar
- Nickname: Big Blue
- Team name: Cougars
- Rival: Beth Tfiloh Dahan Community School
- Accreditation: Middle States Association of Colleges and Schools
- Yearbook: Carmelight
- Website: http://www.olmcmd.org

Our Lady of Mount Carmel School (OLMC) is a Roman Catholic-Pre Kindergarten through 12 school in Essex, Baltimore County, Maryland. It is located within the Roman Catholic Archdiocese of Baltimore.

== Description ==
The school was established in 1927 to serve the students of Our Lady of Mount Carmel Parish and surrounding Essex-Middle River Community. As of 2024, the school had 580 students.

== See also ==
- National Catholic Educational Association
