= Saints Peter and Paul School =

School in Maryland, United States

- Sanctorum Petri et Pauli Schola

Location
- 900 High Street; Easton, Maryland; Easton, Talbot County, Maryland 21601; United States
- Coordinates: 38°46′8″N 76°3′42″W

Information
- Type: Private, Coeducational
- Motto: Mens. Corpus. Spiritus. (Mind. Body. Spirit)
- Religious affiliation: Roman Catholic
- Established: 1958
- Founder: Rt. Rev. J. H. Irwin
- Oversight: The parish of Saints Peter and Paul Church and a school board
- Principal: Scott Wilson - High School
- Principal: Sherrie Connolly - Elementary School
- Grades: Pre-K–12
- Average class size: 25
- Colors: Navy Blue and White
- Song: Alma Mater
- Fight song: Blue and White
- Athletics conference: MIAA, ESIAC, MDISA
- Sports: Sailing, Golf, Tennis, Lacrosse, Basketball, Swimming, Baseball, Softball, Field Hockey, Ice Hockey
- Mascot: Sabres
- Nickname: SSPP
- Team name: Sabres
- Accreditation: Middle States Association of Colleges and Schools
- Tuition: $8,500 – Elementary $12,500 – High
- School Prayer: Saints Peter and Paul, Pray for Us. Jesus, Live in Our Hearts, Forever Amen.

Saints Peter and Paul School is a parochial, Roman Catholic, co-educational, day school in Easton, Maryland. It is located in the heart of the Eastern Shore. The school serves an area of seven counties. The High School shares a campus with the Elementary School but has its own principal, staff and faculty. It is run by the Roman Catholic Diocese of Wilmington and is the only Catholic High School on Maryland's Eastern Shore.
