= Annapolis Area Christian School =

Location
- 109 Burns Crossing Road; Severn, Maryland 21144; United States

Information
- School type: Private Christian
- Opened: 1971
- President: Michael Edmonds
- Principal: David Intlekofer(Upper School), Ben Peddicord (Middle School), Jenny Elkins (Severn Lower School), Karyn Baines (Annapolis Lower School).
- Grades: K–12
- Gender: Co-ed
- Student to teacher ratio: 12:1
- Colors: Navy Blue and Gold
- Athletics conference: MIAA (Boys) and IAAM (Girls)
- Nickname: Eagles
- Website: aacsonline.org

Annapolis Area Christian School (AACS) is a private, non-denominational Christian school located in Annapolis and Severn, Maryland, United States. It serves grades Kindergarten through 12.

It was founded in the Reformed tradition in 1971.

== Athletics ==
Boys' high school sports include basketball, baseball, cross country, football, golf, soccer, lacrosse, tennis, track & field, and indoor track.

Girls' high school sports include basketball, cheerleading, cross country, field hockey, soccer, lacrosse, softball, volleyball, tennis, track & field, and indoor track.

All boys' sports participate in the Maryland Interscholastic Athletic Association (MIAA), while all girls' sports participate in the Interscholastic Athletic Association of Maryland (IAAM).
