= UMBC Stadium =

Stadium at the University of Maryland, Baltimore County

Coordinates: 39.250484°N 76.707584°W

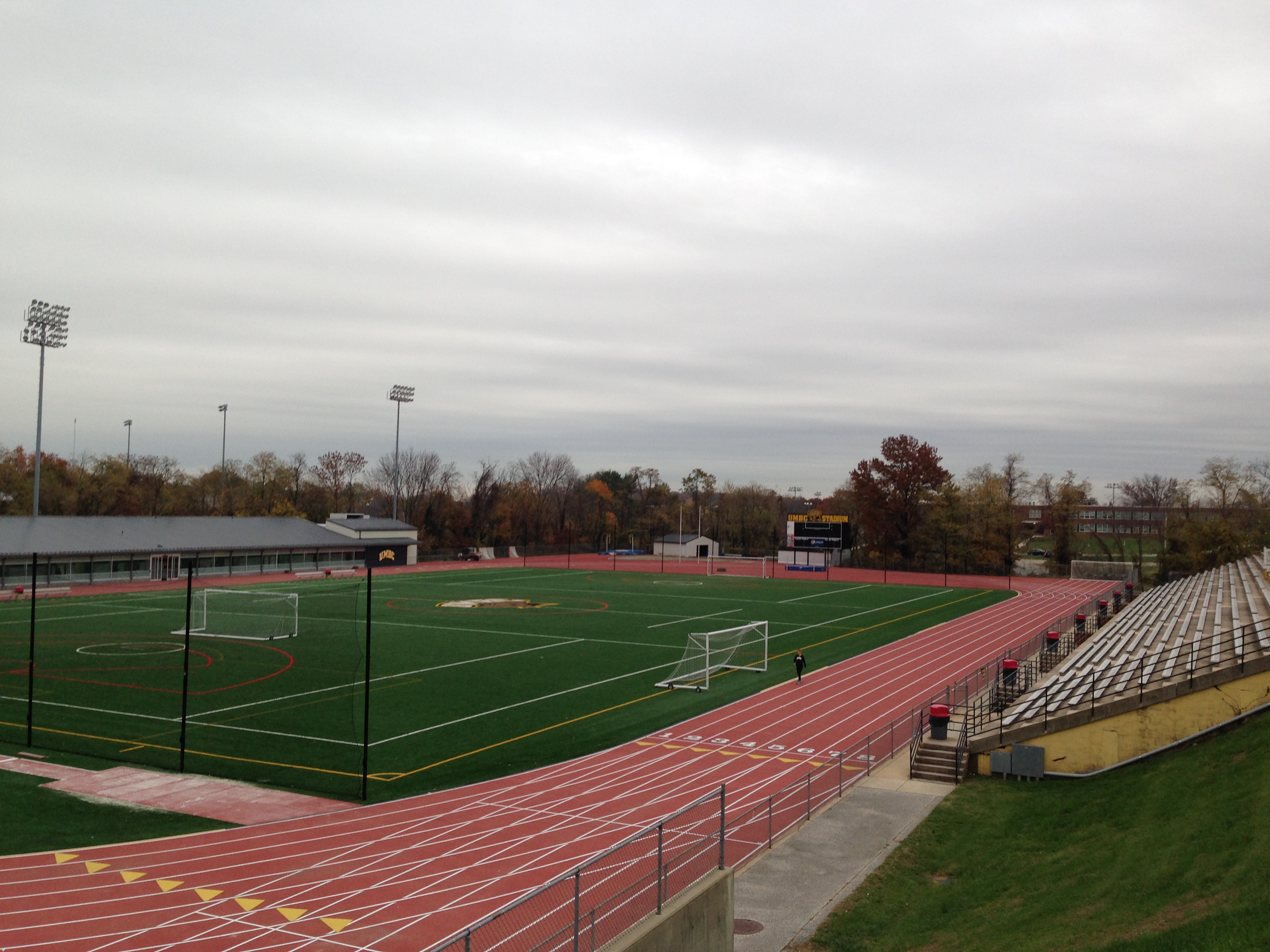
- Interactive map of UMBC Stadium
- Location: UMBC; 1000 Hilltop Circle; Baltimore, Maryland 21250
- Owner: UMBC
- Operator: UMBC
- Capacity: 4,500
- Surface: Sportexe Momentum Turf

Construction
- Opened: 1976

Tenant
- UMBC Retrievers; Crystal Palace Baltimore

UMBC Stadium is a 4,500-seat stadium on the campus of UMBC in Catonsville, Maryland. The stadium opened in 1976. It is home to the UMBC Retrievers men's and women's lacrosse, field hockey, and track and field programs, as well as an alternate venue for soccer. The stadium has also hosted championships for the Northeast Conference in track and field and conference tournaments for the America East Conference in men's and women's lacrosse, as well as tryouts for US Lacrosse's team to compete in the Under-19 World Lacrosse Championships.

In 2008, it also became the home field of Crystal Palace Baltimore, a professional outdoor soccer team that announced plans to become a member of the 2010 incarnation of the North American Soccer League. The NASL's launch was delayed due to a controversy between that league and the United Soccer Leagues. Eventually, the two bodies came to a temporary truce, with the United States Soccer Federation establishing a temporary league, USSF Division 2, for the 2010 season only. Crystal Palace Baltimore plays in this league for 2010. However, midway through the 2010 season, Crystal Palace Baltimore left UMBC and hopped to several different stadiums in the Baltimore area.

The stadium is part of the a complex which also includes The Baseball Factory Field at UMBC and UMBC's softball stadium and is located across the street from the UMBC Event Center and Retriever Soccer Park.
