= Ben Spencer (baseball) =

American baseball player (1890-1970)

- Outfielder
- Born: May 15, 1890; Patapsco, Maryland
- Died: September 1, 1970 (aged 80); Finksburg, Maryland
- Batted: Left Threw: Left

MLB debut
- September 8, 1913, for the Washington Senators

Last MLB appearance
- September 19, 1913, for the Washington Senators

MLB statistics
- Batting average: .286
- Home runs: 0
- Runs batted in: 2

Teams
- Washington Senators (1913)

Lloyd Benjamin Spencer (May 15, 1890 – September 1, 1970) was a Major League Baseball outfielder. Spencer played for the Washington Senators in the 1913 season. In eight games, he had six hits in 21 at-bats for a .286 batting average. Spencer batted and threw left-handed.

Spencer was born in Patapsco, Maryland, and died in Finksburg, Maryland.

Spencer was the grandfather of former Major Leaguer Jim Spencer.
