= Chapelgate Christian Academy =

Location
- 2600 Olive Branch Way; Marriottsville, Maryland 21104; United States
- Coordinates: 39°18′1″N 76°54′17″W

Information
- Type: Christian Private School
- Denomination: Presbyterian
- Established: 1991
- CEEB code: 210744
- Principal: Melissa Barrett
- Grades: PreK-12th
- Enrollment: 300
- Average class size: 12
- Campus type: Rolling hills, playing fields and wooded areas
- Colors: Navy and Gold
- Mascot: Buzz
- Team name: Yellow Jackets
- Accreditation: Middle States, ACSI
- Yearbook: The Blaze
- Tuition: $10,000 - $16,000
- Affiliation: Presbyterian Church in America
- Website: www.chapelgateacademy.org

Chapelgate Christian Academy (CCA) is a private Christian school located in Marriottsville, Maryland. It is affiliated with the Presbyterian Church of America.

Chapelgate Christian Academy is a college preparatory school with a Christian worldview. To gain admittance to the school, a student's parent or guardian must agree with Chapelgate's statement of faith, foremost of which is the belief that the Bible is infallible and inerrant.

Its high school athletic programs on the boys' side compete in the Maryland Interscholastic Athletic Association (MIAA), predominantly in the association's MIAA-C conference. Boys' basketball competes in the MIAA-B.
