= Beth Tfiloh Dahan Community School =

Jewish day school in Baltimore County, Maryland, US

Coordinates: 39.3862°N 76.7074°W

- Baltimore County, Maryland

Information
- School type: Jewish day school
- Religious affiliation: Judaism
- Established: 1942
- Grades: Preschool - Grade 12
- Website: https://www.bethtfiloh.com/school

Beth Tfiloh Dahan Community School is a private community Jewish day school in Baltimore County, Maryland. It encompasses preschool through twelfth grade. The school has one campus in Pikesville. The campus includes the PreSchool, Lower School (Grades K-4), Middle School (Grades 5–8), and the High School (Grades 9-12). Beth Tfiloh operated a second campus in Glyndon which was sold to Shepherd Pratt in 2007. A new 56,000-square-foot (5,200 m^{2}) Lower School complex was constructed on the Old Court campus and was completed in January 2009. Hebrew school is also offered on the Old Court campus.

== History ==
The first Beth Tfiloh Day School Kindergarten class was organized in 1942 with five students in the school's original Forest Park location in Baltimore City. The school was created by Rabbi Samuel Rosenblatt, founder of the Modern Orthodox synagogue Beth Tfiloh Congregation in Baltimore, to address the needs of Jewish families who desired a co-educational program which integrated a secular curriculum with a traditional Zionist-oriented program of Jewish studies. Beth Tfiloh's High School was founded in 1986 as the first coeducational Jewish high school in the Baltimore metropolitan area. It is currently the largest coeducational Jewish high school in the area with over 300 students.

In 1964, a Junior High School division was added in response to an interest voiced by a group of parents, and in 1973, the enrollment for preschool through eighth grade was 345. The Day School was accredited by the Maryland State Department of Education for its secular program in 1976. The half-day Kindergarten was eliminated and replaced by a full day program in 1975.

In 1986, again in response to community needs, Beth Tfiloh Community High School was founded to provide a co-educational, college preparatory high school for students of all levels of religious observance. A new facility was built at Old Court, and the high school moved from temporary quarters to its new school building in 1988.

In 2001, the school opened a new Performing Arts Center and the Russel Family Athletics Center on its Old Court Campus and staffed a new Creative Arts Department.

In 2003 Beth Tfiloh Community School changed its name to Beth Tfiloh Dahan Community School in tribute to Mr. Haron Dahan, one of the school founders and its most generous benefactor to date. The Dean is Rabbi Chai Posner and the Director of Education is Dr. Zipora Schorr. In 2025 Dr Schorr has retired and Ms. Bracha Rutner has taken her place as the school director. School Administration and Head of School.

== Accreditation and awards ==
Beth Tfiloh Dahan Community School is a fully accredited member of the Association of Independent Maryland Schools.

Beth Tfiloh Dahan Community School has also been awarded "Maryland Character Education School of the Year" several times, and was referred to by Baltimore Magazine as a "Power School".

== New Old Court Lower School ==
In the beginning of the 2007–2008 school year, construction began for the new Beth Tfiloh Dahan Lower School on the school's Old Court Campus.

The Old Court Lower School was completed in December 2008, and the Lower School students moved in on January 5, 2009. There was a procession as well as a ribbon cutting by founder, Haron Dahan and benefactor, Marvin H. Weiner, who chaired the construction committee. Students were escorted to the new Lower School by Beth Tfiloh Middle and High School students and were greeted by members of the Beth Tfiloh Congregation and School leadership and various public officials. The new Lower School is connected to the existing Beth Tfiloh Dahan Community School complex and includes a gymnasium, library and a cafeteria, together with classrooms and other amenities that existed on its Glyndon Campus.

== Notable alumni ==
- Julia Ioffe (born 1982), Russian-born American journalist
