= Laurel Blue Hens =

- 1922–1923; Laurel, Delaware

Minor league affiliations
- Class: Class D (1922–1923)
- League: Eastern Shore League (1922–1923)

Major league affiliations
- Team: None

Minor league titles
- League titles (0): None

Team data
- Name: Laurel Blue Hens (1922–1923)
- Ballpark: League Park (1922–1923)

The Laurel Blue Hens were a minor league baseball team based in Laurel, Delaware. In 1922 and 1923, the Blue Hens teams played exclusively as members of the Class D level Eastern Shore League. Laurel hosted home minor league games at League Park.

== History ==
Minor league baseball began in Laurel, Delaware with the 1922 "Laurel Blue Hens." Laurel became charter members of the six–team Class D level Eastern Shore League. The Cambridge Canners, Crisfield Crabbers, Parksley Spuds, Pocomoke City Salamanders and Salisbury Indians teams joined the Laurel Blue Hens as Eastern Shore League charter members.

The use of the "Blue Hens" nickname corresponds to regional history. A company of soldiers from Delaware, known for their courage, who acquired the nickname of "The Blue Hen's Chickens" or "Sons of the Blue Hen." The Blue Hen Chicken became the official state bird of the state of Delaware. Relatedly, beginning in 1911, the athletic teams at the University of Delaware became known as the Blue Hens, a moniker that continues to be used by the university today, updated to the Delaware Fightin' Blue Hens.

The Laurel Blue Hens began play when the Eastern Shore League schedule started on June 12, 1922, with the team hosting home games at League Park. Laurel ended the 1922 season with a record of 34–34, placing fourth in the six–team league, finishing 8.5 games behind the first place Parksley Spuds, who finished with a record of 42–25. The Crisfield Crabbers (36–32) and Cambridge Canners (37–32) finished ahead of the Laurel Blue Hens, who were followed by the Pocomoke City Salamanders (29–41) and Salisbury Indians (27–41) in the final league standings. Laurel was managed by Sam Frock and briefly, Ducky Davis.

The Laurel Blue Hens continued play in the 1923 Eastern Shore League, in what would be their final season. The Blue Hens placed third in the eight–team league with a 42–30 record. The Laurel Blue Hens finished 7.0 games behind the first place Dover Senators while playing under manager John Whalen. Two other league teams folded during the season, as the Milford Sandpipers team withdrew on July 14, 1923 rather than forfeit all of its games due to an ineligible player and the Pocomoke City Salamanders disbanded on August 21, 1923.

On July 19, 1923, in front of a crowd of 4,000, major league baseball commissioner Kenesaw Mountain Landis threw out the first pitch at a game in Salisbury while wearing a Laurel Blue Hens cap to mark the occasion.

After the 1923 season, the Eastern Shore League remained at six teams for the 1924 season. Laurel did not return to play in the 1924 league as the newly formed Easton Farmers franchise replaced Laurel and joined the five returning members. Laurel, Delaware has not hosted another minor league team.

== The ballpark ==
The Laurel Blue Hens teams were noted to have played home minor league games at League Park. The ballpark reportedly no longer exists, with the site becoming residential. It was reported that the Laurel High School band played at home games. The ballpark was located on West Street, between 7th Street and 8th Street in Laurel, Delaware.

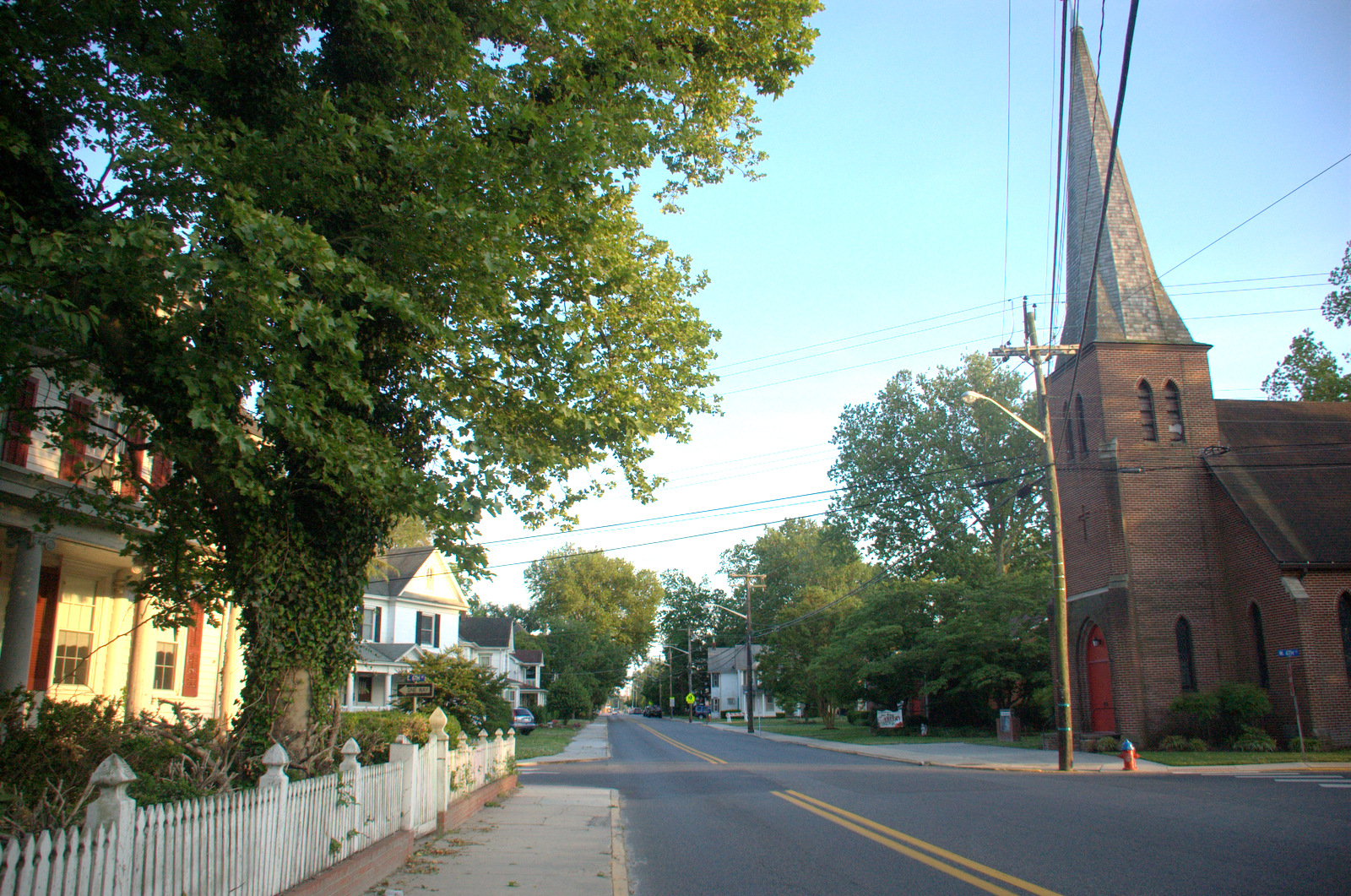
(2017) Laurel Historic District, Phillips & 6th Street. National Register of Historic Places. Laurel, Delaware.

== Timeline ==
Year(s)	# Yrs.	Team	Level	League
1922–1923	2	Laurel Blue Hens	Class D	Eastern Shore League

== Year–by–year records ==
Year	Record	Finish	Manager	Playoffs/Notes
1922	34–34	4th	Sam Frock / Ducky Davis	No playoffs held
1923	42–30	3rd	John Whalen	No playoffs held

== Notable alumni ==
- Eddie Bacon (1923)
- Sam Frock (1922, MGR)
- Laurel Blue Hens players
