= Seaford Eagles =

- 1946–1949; Seaford, Delaware

Minor league affiliations
- Class: Class D (1946–1949)
- League: Eastern Shore League (1946–1949)

Major league affiliations
- Team: New York Giants (1947–1948); Philadelphia Phillies (1949)

Minor league titles
- League titles (1): 1947
- Wild card berths (1): 1947

Team data
- Name: Seaford Eagles (1946–1949)
- Ballpark: Seaford Ball Park (1946–1949)

The Seaford Eagles were a minor league baseball team based in Seaford, Delaware. The Eagles played from 1946 to 1949 as charter members of the Class D level Eastern Shore League, ending play when the league permanently folded. The Eagles were minor league affiliates of the New York Giants in 1947 and 1948 and the Philadelphia Phillies in 1949, playing home games at the Seaford Ball Park. The Seaford Eagles won the 1947 Eastern Shore League championship.

== History ==
Seaford, Delaware hosted teams playing in amateur leagues beginning as early as 1888, when the "Seaford nine" defeated the Delaware Field Club 9–3 to claim the mythical state baseball championship. The Seaford team later played as a member of the Amateur Baseball League of Delaware. Seaford, Delaware reportedly hosted semi–professional baseball teams as early as 1918. Eddie Rommel and Jimmy Dykes were noted to have played for Seaford semi–pro teams.

Minor league baseball began in Seaford, Delaware in 1946. The Seaford "Eagles" were formed and became members of the eight–team Class D level Eastern Shore League, as the league resumed play following World War II. The Cambridge Dodgers, Centreville Orioles, Dover Phillies, Easton Yankees, Federalsburg A's, Milford Red Sox and Salisbury Cardinals teams joined Seaford in beginning league play on May 9, 1946.

In 1946, the Seaford franchise was noted to have been formed after public shares of the team were sold for $10.00 each. A contest was held to name the team and Arnold Spicer was the winner, submitting the "Eagles" moniker. Spicer received a free pass to all 1946 home games.

In their first season of play, the 1946, the Seaford Eagles began Eastern Shore League play. Easton ended the 1946 season with a record of 58–68, placing sixth in the eight–team league. Managed by Joe Becker and John Youse, the Eagles finished 30.5 games behind the first place Centreville Orioles in the regular season standings. Seaford did not qualify for the four–team playoffs, won by Centreville.

Continuing Eastern Shore League play in 1947, the Seaford Eagles became a minor league affiliate of the New York Giants and won the 1947 Eastern Shore League championship. The Eagles placed second as the team finished the regular season with a record of 70–49, playing under manager Bob Westfall. Seaford finished 16.0 games behind the first place Cambridge Dodgers in the eight–team league regular season standings. In the four–team playoffs, the Seaford Eagles won their first round series, defeating Federalsburg 4 games to 0 in a sweep. In the 1947 Finals, Seaford defeated Cambridge in a seven-game series 4 games to 3 to win the championship. Seaford had reported 1947 home attendance of 54,637.

A home crowd of 3,705 was on hand for the Seaford Eagles' 11–9 Game 7 victory over Cambridge that clinched the 1947 championship.

The 1948 Seaford Eagles continued play as a New York Giants affiliate and the team placed sixth in the eight–team Eastern Shore League standings. Seaford ended the season with a record of 56–70, playing under returning manager Bob Westfall and Socks Seibold. The Eagles finished 35.5 games behind the first place Salisbury Cardinals in the final regular season standings and did not qualify for the playoffs, won by the Milford Red Sox. Pitcher John Andre of Seaford led the Northshore League with both 21 wins and 228 strikeouts.

In their final Season of play, the Seaford Eagles became a Philadelphia Phillies minor league affiliate. The Eagles did not qualify for the Eastern Shore League playoffs in the final season of play for the eight–team league. Playing under manager Paul Gaulin, the Eagles ended the 1949 Eastern Shore League season with a record of 56–64, placing fifth in the final standings. Seaford narrowly missed qualifying for the four–team playoffs, finishing 1.0 game behind the 4th place Rehoboth Beach Sea Hawks, who eventually won the playoffs. Seaford finished 12.5 games behind the first place Easton Yankees in the regular season standings. Duke Markell of Seaford led the league with an ERA of 2.17.

The Eastern Shore League permanently folded after the 1949 season. Seaford, Delaware has not hosted another minor league team.

== The ballpark ==
The Seaford Eagles minor league teams played minor league home games exclusively at Seaford Ball Park. The ballpark was a new park in 1946 and had a capacity of 2,000. The ballpark was noted to have been located on Middleford Road and where the site of Soroptomist Park is located today. Soroptomist park is still in use as a public park, located at 994 Middleford Road in Seaford, Delaware.

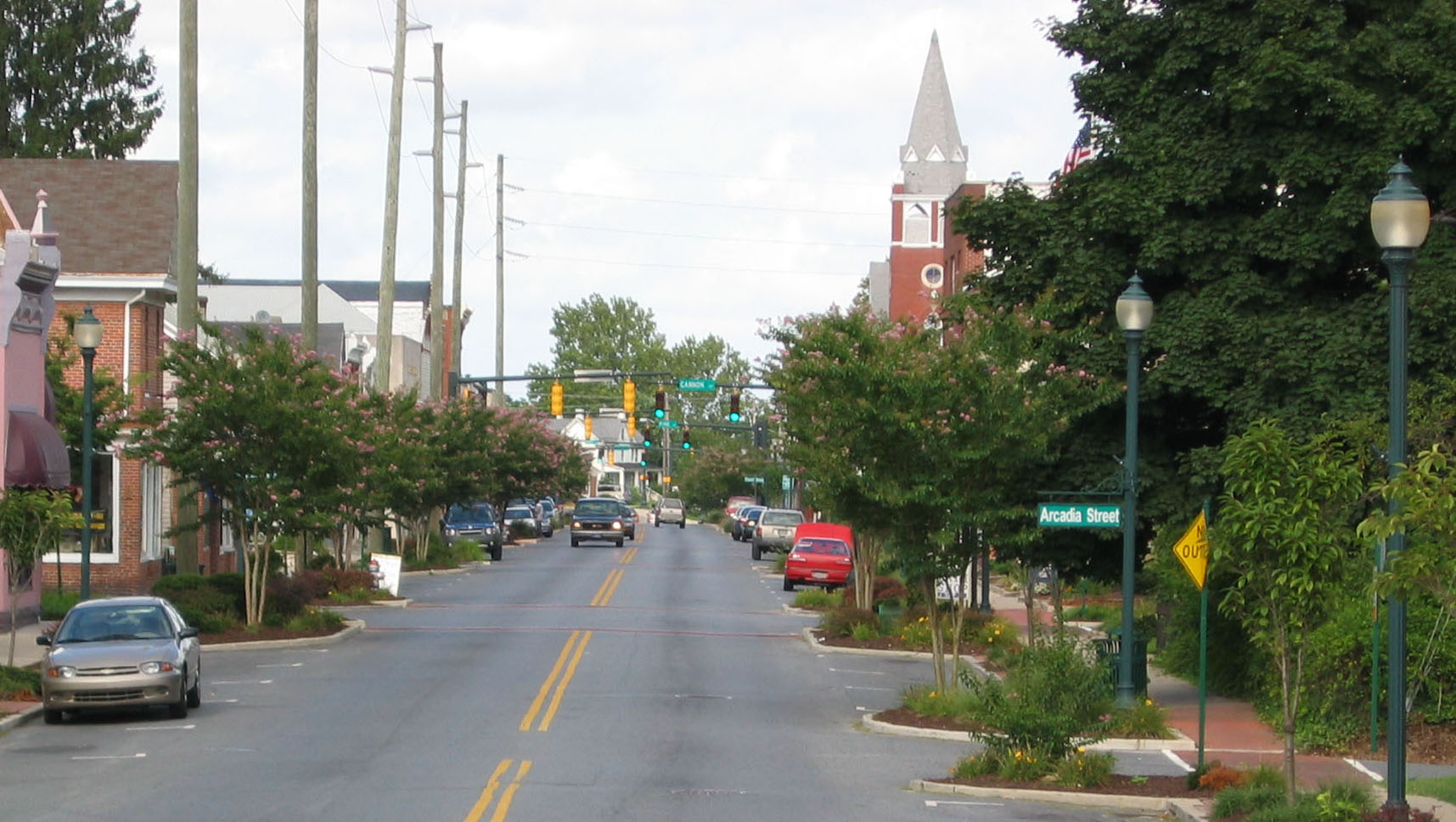
(2006) High Street. Seaford, Delaware

== Timeline ==
Year(s)	# Yrs.	Team	Level	League	Affiliate	Ballpark
1946	1	Seaford Eagles	Class D	Eastern Shore League	None	Seaford Ball Park
1947–1948	2	Seaford Eagles	Class D	Eastern Shore League	New York Giants	Seaford Ball Park
1949	1	Seaford Eagles	Class D	Eastern Shore League	Philadelphia Phillies	Seaford Ball Park

== Year–by–year records ==
Year	Record	Finish	Manager	Playoffs/notes
1946	58–68	6th	Joe Becker / John Youse	Did not qualify
1947	70–49	2nd	Bob Westfall	League champions
1948	56–70	6th	Bob Westfall / Socks Seibold	Did not qualify
1949	56–64	5th	Paul Gaulin	Did not qualify

== Notable alumni ==
- John Andre (1947–1948)
- Joe Becker (1946, MGR)
- Duke Markell (1946–1947)
- Hank Schmulbach (1946)
- Socks Seibold (1948, MGR)
- Nick Testa (1947)

== See also ==
- Seaford Eagles players
