= Federalsburg A's =

- 1937–1949; (1937–1941, 1946–1949); Federalsburg, Maryland

Minor league affiliations
- Class: Class D (1937–1941, 1946–1949)
- League: Eastern Shore League (1937–1941, 1946–1949)

Major league affiliations
- Team: Philadelphia Athletics (1937–1941, 1946–1948)

Minor league titles
- League titles (0): None
- Conference titles (1): 1939

Team data
- Name: Federalsburg A's (1937–1941, 1946–1948); Federalsburg Feds (1949)
- Ballpark: Federal Park (1937–1941, 1946–1949)

The Federalsburg A's were a minor league baseball team based in Federalsburg, Maryland. Federalsburg teams played as exclusively as members of the Class D level Eastern Shore League from 1937 to 1941 and 1946 to 1949, winning the 1939 league pennant. The "A's" moniker was interchanged with the similar "Athletics" and "Little A's" before the franchise became the "Feds" for their final season of 1949. Hosting all minor league home games at Federal Park, Federalsburg played as a minor league affiliate of the Philadelphia Athletics from 1937 to 1941 and 1946 to 1948.

== History ==
=== Eastern Shore League 1937–1941 ===
Minor league baseball began in Federalsburg, Maryland in 1937 when the Federalsburg "A's" (or interchangeable "Athletics") became members as the eight–team Class D level Eastern Shore League. Adopting their nickname, Federalsburg was a minor league affiliate of the Philadelphia Athletics, a partnership that would continue until 1949. Playing under manager George Short, Federalsburg ended their first season of play with a 52–45 record, placing fifth in the regular season standings, finishing 7.5 games behind the first place Salisbury Indians. Salisbury had 21 wins taken away due to roster violations, but still won the pennant. Salisbury had 21 wins taken away due to roster violations, but still won the pennant.

As there were no hotels in Federalsburg during the era in which the Federalsburg A's played, players had to stay in private residences. Typically, players paid $1 a day (from their $75 a month salary) to stay with families in their homes near their home ballpark of Federal Field. It was reported the local community "adopted" players and treated them like family members.

Continuing play in the 1938 Eastern Shore League, the Federalsburg A's placed fifth in the eight–team league, with Charlie Moss serving as manager. Federalsburg ended the 1938 regular season with a 56–56 record, finishing 9.0 games behind the first place Salisbury Indians. Bill Phillips of Federalsburg led the North Shore League with 31 home runs.

The 1939 Federalsburg A's won the Eastern Shore League pennant by a large margin. Federalsburg finished first in the eight–team league and ended the 1938 regular season with a 83–38 record, playing the season under manager Sammy Holbrook. The A's ended the regular season 14.0 games ahead of the second place Cambridge Cardinals. In the playoffs, the Dover Orioles defeated Federalsburg 3 games to 0 to end their season. Federalsburg pitcher Les Hinckle led the Eastern Shore League in three categories, with 27 wins, 309 strikeouts and a 2.49 ERA.

The 1940 Federalsburg A's ended the Eastern Shore League season with a record of 57–67, playing the season under managers Samuel Nisinoff and Don Maynard. Federalsburg placed fifth in the final standings, finishing 17.0 games behind the first place Dover Orioles in the eight–team league. With their fifth place finish, Federalsburg did not qualify for the four-team playoffs won by the Cambridge Cardinals. Lloyd Rice of Federalsburg led the Eastern Shore League in batting average, hitting .363.

The Federalsburg A's finished last in the 1941 Eastern Shore League. With a record of 35–73, Federalsburg placed sixth in the six–team league, finishing 31.0 games behind the first place Milford Giants in the final regular season standings, as the league reduced to a six-team league. Joe O'Rourke managed the A's in 1941. The Eastern Shore League did not return to play for the 1942 season due to World War II.

=== Eastern Shore League 1946–1949 ===
The Federalsburg A's returned to Eastern Shore League play in 1946, as the league reformed following World War II as an eight-team Class D level league. The team remained as a minor league affiliate of the Philadelphia Athletics. In their return to play, the Federalsburg A's finished in last place in the 1946 standings. The A's ended the 1946 season with a record of 37–87, placing eighth in the eight–team league, finishing 50.5 games behind the first place Centreville Orioles, as Lew Krausse Sr. managed the team. The A's didn't qualify for the four-team playoffs won by the Centreville Orioles.

The Federalsburg A's placed fourth in the standings of the Eastern Shore League in the 1947 season and qualified for the playoffs. The A's ended the regular season with a record of 62–63, finishing 29.0 games behind the first place Cambridge Dodgers, as Pep Rambert served as the Federalsburg player/manager. In the four-team playoffs, the eventual champion Seaford Eagles swept the A's in three games. In his dual role, Rambert won the North Shore League in batting title, hitting. 376. Teammate Ducky Detweiler of Federalsburg led the league with both 29 home runs and 133 RBI.

The Federalsburg A's played their final season as a Philadelphia Athletics affiliate in 1948and ended the regular season in seventh place in the eight-team Eastern Shore League. With a regular season record of 49–76, Federalsburg placed seventh in the league standings, playing the season under player/manager Ducky Detweiler. The A's finished 42.0 games behind the first place Salisbury Cardinals in the final regular season standings. Federalsburg did not qualify for the playoffs, won by the Milford Red Sox.

In their final Season of play, the franchise was unaffiliated and the renamed Federalsburg "Feds" played the season under manager Carl McQuillen and advanced to the league finals. The Federalsburg Feds ended the 1949 Eastern Shore League season with a record of 63–56, placing second and finishing 4.5 games behind the first place Easton Yankees in the regular season standings. After a round robin series of the top four teams, the Rehoboth Beach Sea Hawks defeated Federalsburg in the Finals, 4 games to 3. Bob Westfall of Federalsburg led the league with 19 home runs and 113 RBS, as well as 126 runs scored and 158 total hits.

The Eastern Shore League permanently folded after the 1949 season, the league never reformed. Federalsburg, Maryland has not hosted another minor league team.

== The ballpark ==
Federalsburg teams played home games exclusively at Federal Park. The ballpark had a capacity of 1,200 in 1937 and 1,800 in 1946. The park dimensions were (Left, Center, Right): 323–346–335 in 1937. Today, original artifacts from the ballpark are on display at the Federalsburg Historical Society & Museum. The team clubhouse building still exists. Federal Park was located at University Avenue and Greenridge Road, Federalsburg, Maryland.

== Timeline ==
| Year(s) | # Yrs. | Team | Level | League | Affiliate | Ballpark |
|---|---|---|---|---|---|---|
| 1937–1941 | 5 | Federalsburg A's | Class D | Eastern Shore League | Philadelphia Athletics | Federal Park |
| 1946–1948 | 3 | Federalsburg A's | Class D | Eastern Shore League | Philadelphia Athletics | Federal Park |
| 1949 | 1 | Federalsburg Feds | Class D | Eastern Shore League | None | Federal Park |

== Year–by–year records ==
| Year | Record | Finish | Manager | Playoffs/notes |
|---|---|---|---|---|
| 1937 | 52–45 | 5th | George Short | No playoffs held |
| 1938 | 56–56 | 5th | Charlie Moss | No playoffs held |
| 1939 | 83–38 | 1st | Sammy Holbrook | League champions |
| 1940 | 57–67 | 5th | Samuel Nisinoff / Don Maynard | No playoffs held |
| 1941 | 35–73 | 6th | Joe O'Rourke | No playoffs held |
| 1946 | 37–87 | 8th | Lew Krausse Sr. | No playoffs held |
| 1947 | 62–63 | 4th | Pep Rambert | No playoffs held |
| 1948 | 49–78 | 7th | Ducky Detweiler | No playoffs held |
| 1949 | 63–56 | 2nd | Carl McQuillen | Lost in finals |

== Notable alumni ==
- Ducky Detweiler (1939–1940, 1947–1949), (1948, MGR)
- Buck Etchison (1949)
- Gene Hermanski (1939–1940)
- George Hennessey (1938)
- Jim Higgins (1938)
- Sammy Holbrook (1938–1939)
- Lew Krausse Sr. (1946, MGR)
- Walt Masters (1939)
- Charlie Moss (1938, MGR)
- Dick Mulligan (1940)
- Barney Mussill (1938–1939)
- Ron Northey (1939)
- Tony Parisse (1940)
- Pep Rambert (1947, MGR)
- Joe Rullo (1939–1940)
- Jim Schelle (1939)
- Elmer Valo (1939) Philadelphia Baseball Wall of Fame
- Jack Wallaesa (1939)
- Spider Wilhelm (1947–1948)

== See also ==
- Federalsburg A's players
- Federalsburg Feds players
