= Rehoboth Beach Pirates =

- 1947–1949; Rehoboth Beach, Delaware

Minor league affiliations
- Class: Class D (1947–1949)
- League: Eastern Shore League (1947–1949)

Major league affiliations
- Team: Pittsburgh Pirates (1947–1948)

Minor league titles
- League titles (1): 1949
- Wild card berths (1): 1949

Team data
- Name: Rehoboth Beach Pirates (1947–1948); Rehoboth Beach Sea Hawks (1949)
- Ballpark: Rehoboth Beach Ball Park (1947–1949)

The Rehoboth Beach Pirates were a minor league baseball team based in Rehoboth Beach, Delaware. From 1947 to 1949 Rehoboth Beach played exclusively as members of the Class D level Eastern Shore League, winning the 1949 league championship in the league's final season of play. The Rehoboth Beach "Pirates" were a minor league affiliate of the Pittsburgh Pirates in the 1947 and 1948 seasons. After the affiliation with the Pirates ended, the 1949 Rehoboth Beach "Sea Hawks" captured the championship. Rehoboth Beach teams hosted home minor league games at the Rehoboth Beach Ball Park.

== History ==
Minor league baseball began in Rehoboth Beach, Delaware in 1947, with the franchise playing as a minor league affiliate of the Pittsburgh Pirates. The Rehoboth Beach "Pirates" were formed and became members of the eight–team Class D level Eastern Shore League. The Cambridge Dodgers, Dover Phillies, Easton Yankees, Federalsburg A's, Milford Red Sox, Salisbury Cardinals and Seaford Eagles teams joined Rehoboth Beach in beginning league play on May 8, 1947. Rehoboth Beach replaced the Centreville Orioles franchise in the league.

In their first season of play, the Rehoboth Beach Pirates of the Eastern Shore League ended the 1947 season in sixth place. The Pirates finished the season with a record of 49–75, playing under managers Gordon McKinnon and Doug Peden. Rehoboth Beach finished 41.5 games behind the first place Cambridge Dodgers in the regular season standings. The Pirates did not qualify for the four-team playoffs won by the Seaford Eagles.

The 1948 Rehoboth Beach Pirates continued play as a Pittsburgh Pirates minor league affiliate, for a final season. The team ended the Eastern Shore League season with a record of 60–65. The Pirates placed fifth in the league standings, playing under manager returning manager Doug Peden. Rehoboth Beach finished 27.0 games behind the first place Salisbury Cardinals in the final regular season standings and did not qualify for the playoffs, won by the Milford Red Sox.

In their final Season of play, the Rehoboth Beach Sea Hawks won the Eastern Shore League championship. Playing under managers Bill Sisler and Johnny Watson, the Sea Hawks ended the 1949 Eastern Shore League season with a record of 56–63, placing fourth in the final standings and qualifying for the four–team playoffs. Rehoboth Beach finished 11.5 games behind the first place Easton Yankees in the regular season standings. After a round robin playoff series of the top four teams, the Rehoboth Beach Sea Hawks advanced to the finals with a 4–2 record. In the Finals, Rehoboth Beach defeated the Federalsburg Feds 4 games to 3 to win the final championship of the Eastern Shore League. The Eastern Shore League permanently folded after the 1949 season.

In their final game, the Game 7 victory over Federalsburg, it was reported that Sea Hawks' pitcher Les Wolf, coming off a 1–6 record with a 7.00 ERA in the regular season, threw a five–hit, complete game shutout to clinch the championship for Rehoboth Beach.

The Eastern Shore League did not return to play in 1950. Rehoboth Beach, Delaware has not hosted another minor league team.

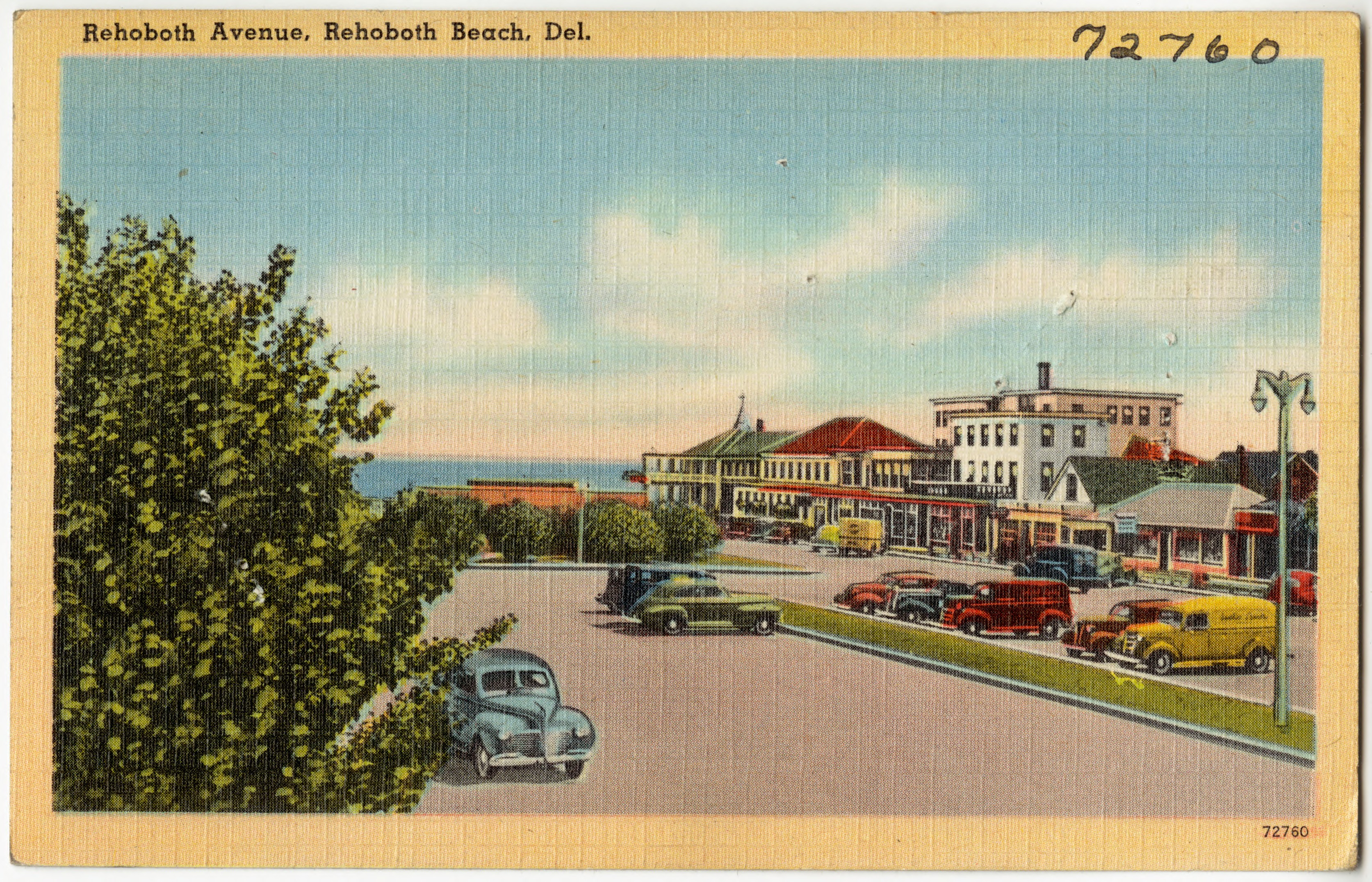
(1945) Rehoboth Avenue. Rehoboth Beach, Delaware

== The ballpark ==
The Rehoboth Beach minor league teams played home games exclusively at the Rehoboth Beach Ball Park. The ballpark had a noted capacity of 3,700 and was a new ballpark for the team, built at a reported cost of $91,000.

== Timeline ==
| Year(s) | # Yrs. | Team | Level | League | Affiliate | Ballpark |
|---|---|---|---|---|---|---|
| 1947–1948 | 2 | Rehoboth Beach Pirates | Class D | Eastern Shore League | Pittsburgh Pirates | Rehoboth Beach Ball Park |
| 1949 | 1 | Rehoboth Beach Sea Hawks | Class D | Eastern Shore League | None | Rehoboth Beach Ball Park |

== Year–by–year records ==
| Year | Record | Finish | Manager | Playoffs/notes |
|---|---|---|---|---|
| 1947 | 49–75 | 6th | Gordon McKinnon / Doug Peden | Did not qualify |
| 1948 | 60–65 | 5th | Doug Peden | Did not qualify |
| 1949 | 56–63 | 4th | Bill Sisler / Johnny Watson | League champions |

== Notable alumni ==
- John Andre (1949)
- Hal Bevan (1948)
- Joe Muir (1947)
- Johnny Watson (1949, MGR)

== See also ==
- Rehoboth Beach Pirates players
- Rehoboth Beach Sea Hawks players
