= Northampton Red Sox =

- 1927–1928; Cape Charles, Virginia

Minor league affiliations
- Class: Class D (1927–1928)
- League: Eastern Shore League (1927–1928)

Major league affiliations
- Team: None

Minor league titles
- League titles (1): 1928

Team data
- Name: Northampton Red Sox (1927–1928)
- Ballpark: Patton Field (1927–1928)

The Northampton Red Sox were a minor league baseball team based in Cape Charles, Virginia, which lies within Northampton County, Virginia. In 1927 and 1928, the Northampton Red Sox played exclusively as members of the Class D level Eastern Shore League, winning the 1928 league championship. The Red Sox hosted minor league home games at Patton Field. The team nickname was in reference to their uniforms.

== History ==
Prior to minor league baseball, Cape Charles, Virginia hosted the semi–pro Pennsylvania Railroad Baseball Team at Patton Field.

Minor league baseball began in Cape Charles, Virginia and Northampton County, Virginia with the 1927 Northampton Red Sox, who became members of the six–team Class D level Eastern Shore League. The league began play on May 27, 1927, with the Cambridge Canners, Crisfield Crabbers, Easton Farmers, Parksley Spuds and Salisbury Indians joining Northampton in league play.

The Northampton Red Sox team wore red trim hose and the franchise took the name of Northampton County, while playing home games at Patton Field in Cape Charles. The team was not an affiliate of the Boston Red Sox.

In their first season of play, the 1927 Northampton Red Sox finished last in the 1927 Eastern Shore League. With a regular season record of 30–55, the Red Sox placed sixth in the final standings under manager Jack Sauter, finishing 28.5 games behind the first place Parksley Spuds. Northampton finished behind the Parksley Spuds (60–28), Salisbury Indians (48–38), Crisfield Crabbers (44–43), Cambridge Canners (41–47) and Easton Farmers (36–48) in the standings.

In their final season, Northampton won a championship in a shortened season. The 1928 Eastern Shore League folded during the season with the Northampton Red Sox in first place. After beginning play on June 2, 1928, the league folded on July 10, 1928, with the Northampton Red Sox having a record of 22–9, playing under manager Lester Bangs. Northampton was in first place in the standings when the six–team league folded, 0.5 game ahead the second place Salisbury Indians. Northampton finished ahead of Salisbury (22–10), the Crisfield Crabbers (14–17), Cambridge Canners (13–19), Easton Farmers (13–20) and Parksley Spuds (12–21) in the final standings.

The Northampton franchise permanently folded following the 1928 season. Cape Charles, Virginia and Northampton County, Virginia have not hosted another minor league team.

== The ballpark ==
The Northampton Red Sox played minor league home games in Cape Charles, Virginia. Their home ballpark was named Patton Field. Patton Field was built before the 1915 season and was located near the New York & Pennsylvania Railroad / Pennsylvania Railroad tracks. Patton Field was named after William A. Patton, president of the Pennsylvania Railroad. The ballpark no longer exists.

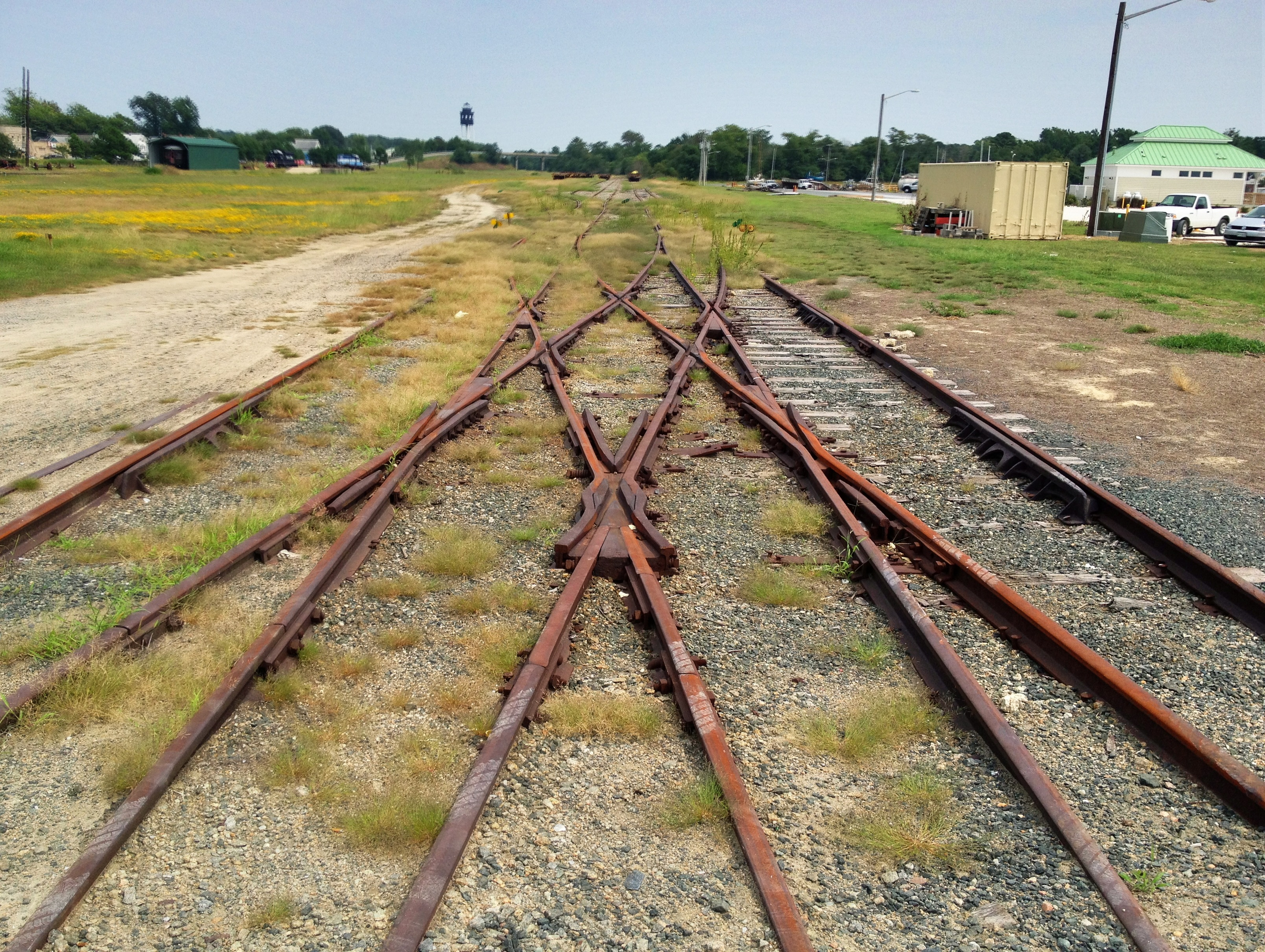
(2013) Cape Charles - Railway lines

== Timeline ==
Year(s)	# Yrs.	Team	Level	League	Ballpark
1927–1928	2	Northampton Red Sox	Class D	Eastern Shore League	Patton Field

== Year-by-year records ==
Year	Record	Finish	Manager	Playoffs/notes
1927	30–55	6th	Jack Saute	No playoffs held
1928	22–9	1st	Lester Bangs	League folded July 10; League champions

== Notable alumni ==
- Cy Malis (1927)
- Roy Parmelee (1927)

=== See also ===
Northampton Red Sox players
