= Eastern Shore League =

Former Delmarva class D minor league baseball league

- Most recent season or competition: 1949 Eastern Shore League season
- Classification: Class D (1922–1927, 1937–1941, 1946–1949)
- Sport: Minor League Baseball
- First season: 1922
- Folded: 1949
- President: Walter B. Miller (1922); M.B. Thawley (1923, 1925); J. Harry Rew (1924, 1926–1928); J. Thomas Kibler (1937); Harry S. Russell (1938–1941); J. Thomas Kibler (1946–1947); Dallas Culver (1948–1949)
- No. of teams: 14
- Country: United States of America
- Most titles: 3 Parksley Spuds (1922, 1924, 1927); Salisbury Cardinals (1937, 1938, 1948)
- Related competitions: Blue Ridge League

The Eastern Shore Baseball League was a class D minor league baseball league that operated on the Delmarva Peninsula for parts of three different decades. The league's first season was in 1922 and the last was in 1949, although the years were not consecutive, and featured teams from Maryland, Delaware, and Virginia. The first incarnation lasted from 1922 to mid-1928 (disbanded in July), the second from 1937 to 1941, and the third from 1946 to 1949. Though the level of play was competitive and many future major leaguers gained experience in the ESBL, funding the league remained a constant problem for the rural franchises.

Future major leaguers who played in the ESBL include notables such as: Frank "Home Run" Baker, Mickey Cochrane, Jimmie Foxx, Mickey Vernon, and Don Zimmer.

The Eastern Shore Baseball Hall of Fame at Arthur W. Perdue Stadium in Salisbury, Maryland, pays homage to ESBL players and locals who made the major leagues. Perdue Stadium is the home of the class A Delmarva Shorebirds, an Orioles farm team.

== History ==
=== Founding ===
The class D "Eastern Shore League" was started in 1922 using teams from the pre-existing Eastern Shore League, a group which had been playing baseball since the 1890s. The first meeting of the class D league was held on October 8, 1921, in Salisbury, Maryland where it was decided that the seven teams that completed the 1921 season would be joined by an eighth team for the 1922 season. The seven teams that completed the 1921 season were Cambridge, Crisfield, Laurel, Pocomoke City, Princess Anne, Salisbury, and Snow Hill. Four towns attended the meeting to seek expansion teams; Dover and Milford in Delaware, Berlin in Maryland, and Parksley in Virginia. Dover and Milford withdrew their request after it was decided that only one new team would be added for 1922. The Parksley team was nominated by Pocomoke City and the Berlin team by Snow Hill, with Berlin winning the vote 4 to 3. At this meeting, a $1,750 a month salary limit was put in place and it was decided to divide gate receipts 50/50 with a guarantee of at least $60 per game. It was also announced that three town, Berlin, Cambridge, and Princess Anne, would build new ballparks.

The Board of Directors met on October 22, 1921, and elected Walter B. Miller of Salisbury as the first President of the league. It was decided upon a 70-game schedule, five games at home and five games on the road, versus each team in the league for the 1922 season, with the final day being Labor Day. A general admission fee of 40 cents, including war tax, was set, and it was decided that each team should post an $875 guarantee by March 1, 1922, in order to assure the team would finish out the season. At this point, it was decided that having three teams in Worcester County would be too many. The director for each of the three teams, Berlin, Pocomoke City, and Snow Hill, volunteered for their team to withdraw. A vote was held and Snow Hill was eliminated, with the opening for the eighth team in the inaugural season being offered to Parksley, Virginia.

A meeting of Snow Hill residents was held shortly after where resolutions were passed protesting Snow Hill's removal from the league and it was reported that President Miller would call the Board of Directors back together to reconsider Snow Hill's removal. By early November, it was reported that the residents of Snow Hill were so angered by their team being removed from the 1922 season, there was concern of it affecting elections in Worcester County that fall, as Snow Hill residents stated they would not support any candidate from Pocomoke City due to the Pocomoke City delegation not supporting Snow Hill to remain in the league. This was refuted later, stating it was merely the opinion of a few young men in the heat of anger and the story had been spread to affect the election.

In mid-November, President Miller announced that the Eastern Shore League was admitted by the National Association of Professional Baseball Clubs and that arrangements were being made for the winner of the league to face the winner of the Blue Ridge League. By November 29, Snow Hill fans had threatened legal action, requesting an injunction to prevent the league from playing any scheduled games until Snow Hill was allowed to return to the league, saying that the league's organizational meeting was held at Snow Hill's suggestion. On December 13, it was announced that Princess Anne was dropping out of the league because it could not find an adequate location for a new ballpark at a reasonable price, and that the former ballpark at Washington High School was too small for the league. Speculation then began that Snow Hill may re-enter the league, that Princess Anne could be replaced by Milford or Dover in Delaware, or Easton, Maryland, who had been invited to the first meeting and declined, or that the league could contract and play as a six-team league for 1922, with Cambridge being mentioned as a possible contraction candidate. At a meeting on January 5, 1922, it was announced that the decision by Princess Anne to withdraw was final and the representative of the Berlin team offered to withdraw, since Berlin was the last team added to the league. The league accepted the withdrawal under the terms that if the league expanded to eight teams again, Berlin would be added back.

=== 1922 Season ===
The opening game of the inaugural season was played on June 9, 1922, between the Laurel Blue Hens and Cambridge Canners in Laurel.

== Cities represented ==
| Cities represented | Teams | Year(s) |
|---|---|---|
| Cambridge, Maryland | Cambridge Canners | 1922–1928, 1940–1941 |
| Cambridge, Maryland | Cambridge Cardinals | 1937–1939 |
| Cambridge, Maryland | Cambridge Dodgers | 1946–1949 |
| Centreville, Maryland | Centreville Colts | 1937–1939 |
| Centreville, Maryland | Centreville Red Sox | 1940–1941 |
| Centreville, Maryland | Centreville Orioles | 1946 |
| Crisfield, Maryland | Crisfield Crabbers | 1922–1928, 1937 |
| Dover, Delaware | Dover Dobbins | 1923-1926 |
| Dover, Delaware | Dover Orioles | 1937–1940 |
| Dover, Delaware | Dover Phillies | 1946–1948 |
| Easton, Maryland | Easton Farmers | 1924–1928 |
| Easton, Maryland | Easton Browns | 1937 |
| Easton, Maryland | Easton Cubs | 1938 |
| Easton, Maryland | Easton Yankees | 1939–1941, 1946–1949 |
| Federalsburg, Maryland | Federalsburg Little A's | 1937–1941 |
| Federalsburg, Maryland | Federalsburg A's | 1946–1948 |
| Federalsburg, Maryland | Federalsburg Feds | 1949 |
| Laurel, Delaware | Laurel Blue Hens | 1922–1923 |
| Milford, Delaware | Milford Sandpipers | 1923* |
| Milford, Delaware | Milford Giants | 1938–1941 |
| Milford, Delaware | Milford Red Sox | 1946–1948 |
| Northampton, Virginia | Northampton Red Sox | 1927–1928 |
| Parksley, Virginia | Parksley Spuds | 1922–1928 |
| Pocomoke City, Maryland | Pocomoke City Salamanders | 1922–1923* |
| Pocomoke City, Maryland | Pocomoke City Red Sox | 1937–1939 |
| Pocomoke City, Maryland | Pocomoke City Chicks | 1940 |
| Rehoboth Beach, Delaware | Rehoboth Beach Pirates | 1947–1948 |
| Rehoboth Beach, Delaware | Rehoboth Beach Sea Hawks | 1949 |
| Salisbury, Maryland | Salisbury Indians | 1922–1928, 1937–1938 |
| Salisbury, Maryland | Salisbury (MD) Senators | 1939 |
| Salisbury, Maryland | Salisbury Cardinals | 1940–1941, 1946–1949 |
| Seaford, Delaware | Seaford Eagles | 1946–1949 |

- The Milford team disbanded on July 3, 1923
- The Pocomoke City team disbanded on August 21, 1923

== Standings & statistics ==
=== 1922 to 1928 ===
1922 Eastern Shore League
| Team | W | L | PCT |
|---|---|---|---|
| Parksley Spuds | 42 | 25 | .627 |
| Cambridge Canners | 37 | 32 | .536 |
| Crisfield Crabbers | 36 | 32 | .529 |
| Laurel Blue Hens | 34 | 35 | .493 |
| Pocomoke City Salamanders | 29 | 41 | .414 |
| Salisbury Indians | 27 | 41 | .397 |

1923 Eastern Shore League
| Team | W | L | PCT |
|---|---|---|---|
| Dover Dobbins | 51 | 24 | .680 |
| Cambridge Canners | 47 | 26 | .644 |
| Laurel Blue Hens | 42 | 30 | .583 |
| Salisbury Indians | 34 | 39 | .446 |
| Pocomoke City Salamanders | 27 | 37 | .422 |
| Parksley Spuds | 31 | 45 | .408 |
| Crisfield Crabbers | 26 | 47 | .356 |
| Milford Sandsnipers | 7 | 14 | .333 |

1924 Eastern Shore League
| Team | W | L | PCT |
|---|---|---|---|
| Parksley Spuds | 46 | 34 | .575 |
| Cambridge Canners | 45 | 35 | .563 |
| Salisbury Indians | 44 | 36 | .550 |
| Crisfield Crabbers | 41 | 39 | .513 |
| Dover Senators | 41 | 39 | .513 |
| Easton Farmers | 23 | 57 | .281 |

1925 Eastern Shore League
schedule

| Team standings | W | L | PCT | GB | Managers |
|---|---|---|---|---|---|
| Cambridge Canners | 51 | 38 | .573 | - | Ted Smith |
| Parksley Spuds | 48 | 42 | .533 | 3½ | Thomas Whalen |
| Salisbury Indians | 46 | 44 | .511 | 5½ | Homer Smoot |
| Dover Dobbins | 46 | 44 | .511 | 5½ | Jiggs Donahue |
| Crisfield Crabbers | 42 | 48 | .467 | 9½ | Marty Breslin / Herb Armstrong |
| Easton Farmers | 36 | 53 | .404 | 15 | Frank "Home Run" Baker / Charles Gault / Buck Herzog |

No Playoffs Scheduled.
Five State Championship: Hagerstown (Blue Ridge League) 4 games, Cambridge 3.

Player statistics
| Player | Team | Stat | Tot | Player | Team | Stat | Tot |
|---|---|---|---|---|---|---|---|
| Victor St. Martin | Parksley | BA | .363 | Ted Firth | Parksley | W | 21 |
| Victor St. Martin | Parksley | Runs | 78 | Ted Firth | Parksley | SO | 131 |
| Phil Voyles | Salisbury | Hits | 119 | John Trippe | Cambridge | Pct | .783; 18–5 |
| Victor St. Martin | Parksley | HR | 25 | | | | |
| Charlie Fitzberger | Salisbury | HR | 25 | | | | |

1926 Eastern Shore League
schedule

| Team standings | W | L | PCT | GB | Managers |
|---|---|---|---|---|---|
| Crisfield Crabbers | 63 | 21 | .750 | - | Dan Pasquella |
| Salisbury Indians | 57 | 29 | .670 | 7 | Jack White |
| Dover Senators | 40 | 46 | .465 | 24 | Jiggs Donahue |
| Parksley Spuds | 40 | 46 | .465 | 24 | Win Clark |
| Cambridge Canners | 32 | 54 | .372 | 32 | Thomas Whalen |
| Easton Farmers | 24 | 60 | .286 | 39 | Buck Herzog |

34 Easton wins reversed August 16; 19 Parksley wins reversed August 22; 23 Dover wins & 22 Cambridge wins reversed September 2. Reversals due to salary limit violations.
Five State Championship: Hagerstown (Blue Ridge League) 4 games, Crisfield 2.

Player statistics
| Player | Team | Stat | Tot | Player | Team | Stat | Tot |
|---|---|---|---|---|---|---|---|
| Tony Rensa | Crisfield | BA | .388 | Ted Firth | Parksley | W | 21 |
| Bill Hohman | Easton | Runs | 69 | Ted Firth | Parksley | SO | 143 |
| Floyd McDougall | Parksley | Hits | 113 | A.L. Carlton | Easton | Pct | .765; 13-4 |
| Red Aikens | Cambridge | Hits | 113 | | | | |
| Eddie Stack | Parksley | HR | 22 | | | | |

1927 Eastern Shore League
schedule

| Team standings | W | L | PCT | GB | Managers |
|---|---|---|---|---|---|
| Parksley Spuds | 60 | 28 | .681 | - | Lester Bangs |
| Salisbury Indians | 48 | 38 | .552 | 11 | Thomas Whalen |
| Crisfield Crabbers | 44 | 43 | .506 | 15½ | Dan Pasquella |
| Cambridge Canners | 41 | 47 | .466 | 19 | William Johnson |
| Easton Farmers | 36 | 48 | .462 | 22 | Ted Cather / Jiggs Donahue |
| Northampton Red Sox | 30 | 55 | .353 | 28½ | Jack Sauter |

Five State Championship: Parksley 4 games, Chambersburg (Blue Ridge League) 2.

Player statistics
| Player | Team | Stat | Tot | Player | Team | Stat | Tot |
|---|---|---|---|---|---|---|---|
| Bill Bickham | Parksley | BA | .361 | Cecil Rose | Crisfield | W | 17 |
| Mike McCallister | Parksley | Runs | 71 | Stephen Toner | Salisbury | SO | 132 |
| Bill Bickham | Parksley | Hits | 119 | Clint Brown | Parksley | Pct | .800; 16–4 |
| Paul Richards | Crisfield | HR | 24 | | | | |

1928 Eastern Shore League
schedule

| Team standings | W | L | PCT | GB | Managers |
|---|---|---|---|---|---|
| Northampton Red Sox | 22 | 9 | .710 | - | Lester Bangs |
| Salisbury Indians | 22 | 10 | .688 | ½ | Thomas Whalen |
| Crisfield Crabbers | 14 | 17 | .452 | 8 | Billy Lush |
| Cambridge Canners | 13 | 19 | .406 | 9½ | Jiggs Donahue |
| Easton Farmers | 13 | 20 | .394 | 10 | Dan Pasquella |
| Parksley Spuds | 12 | 21 | .364 | 11 | John Pasquella |

League disbanded July 10.
No Player statistics are known.

=== 1937 to 1941 ===
1937 Eastern Shore League
schedule

| Team standings | W | L | PCT | GB | Managers |
|---|---|---|---|---|---|
| Salisbury Indians | 59 | 37 | .615 | - | Jake Flowers |
| Easton Browns | 56 | 41 | .577 | 3½ | Doc Jacobs |
| Cambridge Cardinals | 53 | 43 | .552 | 6 | Fred Lucas |
| Centreville Colts | 52 | 43 | .547 | 6½ | Patsy O'Rourke |
| Federalsburg Athletics | 52 | 45 | .536 | 7½ | George Short |
| Pocomoke City Red Sox | 42 | 55 | .433 | 17½ | Vic Keene |
| Crisfield Crabbers | 40 | 57 | .412 | 19½ | Dan Pasquella / Bob Clark |
| Dover Orioles | 32 | 65 | .330 | 27½ | Bob Roetz / Jiggs Donahue |

Salisbury 21 wins reversed June 19 due to veteran player limit violations
Playoffs: Salisbury 2 games, Cambridge 1; Centreville 2 games, Easton 1.
Finals: Salisbury 3 games, Centreville 2.

Player statistics
| Player | Team | Stat | Tot | Player | Team | Stat | Tot |
|---|---|---|---|---|---|---|---|
| Jerry Lynn | Salisbury | BA | .342 | Joe Kohlman | Salisbury | W | 25 |
| Alex Pitko | Centreville | Runs | 103 | Joe Kohlman | Salisbury | SO | 257 |
| Frank Treschock | Salisbury | Hits | 131 | John Davis | Cambridge | ERA | 2.02 |
| Frank Treschock | Salisbury | RBI | 84 | Joe Kohlman | Salisbury | Pct | .962; 25–1 |
| Alex Pitko | Centreville | HR | 20 | | | | |

1938 Eastern Shore League
schedule

| Team standings | W | L | PCT | GB | Managers |
|---|---|---|---|---|---|
| Salisbury Indians | 65 | 47 | .580 | - | Jake Flowers |
| Cambridge Cardinals | 61 | 51 | .545 | 4 | Joe Davis |
| Milford Giants | 60 | 52 | .536 | 5 | Val Picinich |
| Dover Orioles | 58 | 54 | .518 | 7 | Wes Kingdon / Walter Millies |
| Federalsburg Athletics | 56 | 56 | .500 | 9 | Charley Moss |
| Easton Cubs | 55 | 56 | .495 | 9½ | George Jacobs |
| Centreville Colts | 51 | 60 | .459 | 13½ | Joe O'Rourke |
| Pocomoke City Red Sox | 41 | 71 | .366 | 24 | Joe Boley / Wes Kingdon |

Playoffs: Salisbury 2 games, Milford 0. Cambridge 2 games, Dover 0.
Finals: Salisbury 3 games, Cambridge 1.

Player statistics
| Player | Team | Stat | Tot | Player | Team | Stat | Tot |
|---|---|---|---|---|---|---|---|
| Sid Gordon | Milford | BA | .352 | John Bassler | Salisbury | W | 17 |
| George Reisinger | Dover | Runs | 110 | Joe Davis | Cambridge | W | 17 |
| Sid Gordon | Milford | Hits | 145 | Bill Yarewick | Milford | SO | 207 |
| Jim Conlan | Salisbury | RBI | 99 | Joe Davis | Cambridge | ERA | 2.02 |
| Bill Phillips | Federalsburg | HR | 31 | Joe Davis; John Bassler | Cambridge; Salisbury | PCT | .773 17-5.773 17–5 |

1939 Eastern Shore League
schedule

| Team standings | W | L | PCT | GB | Attend | Managers |
|---|---|---|---|---|---|---|
| Federalsburg A's | 83 | 38 | .686 | - | 27,000 | Sammy Holbrook |
| Cambridge Cardinals | 68 | 51 | .571 | 14 | 34,000 | Fred Lucas |
| Dover Orioles | 62 | 57 | .521 | 20 | 23,500 | Ray Brubaker /Wes Kingdon; Walt Millies |
| Centreville Colts | 62 | 60 | .508 | 21½ | 21,000 | Dave Cobble / Cap Clark |
| Salisbury Senators | 59 | 59 | .500 | 22½ | 23,000 | Vic Keene / Spud Nachand |
| Easton Yankees | 51 | 68 | .429 | 31 | 32,000 | Ray Powell |
| Milford Giants | 49 | 69 | .416 | 32½ | 19,000 | Earl Smith / Val Picinich |
| Pocomoke City Red Sox | 43 | 75 | .364 | 38½ | 12,000 | Wes Kingdon / Jake Flowers |

Playoffs: Cambridge 3 games, Centreville 0. Dover 3 games, Federalsburg 0.
Finals: Cambridge 4 games, Dover 2.

Player statistics
| Player | Team | Stat | Tot | Player | Team | Stat | Tot |
|---|---|---|---|---|---|---|---|
| Martin Steinman | Milford | BA | .378 | Les Hinckle | Federalsburg | W | 27 |
| Irving Kolberg | Federalsburg | Runs | 111 | Les Hinckle | Federalsburg | SO | 309 |
| Francis Walsh | Centreville | Hits | 163 | Les Hinckle | Federalsburg | ERA | 2.49 |
| Francis Walsh | Centreville | RBI | 129 | Les Hinckle | Federalsburg | PCT | .818 27–6 |
| Henry Schluter | Dover | HR | 29 | | | | |

1940 Eastern Shore League
1940 Eastern Shore League schedule

| Team standings | W | L | PCT | GB | Managers |
|---|---|---|---|---|---|
| Dover Orioles | 72 | 48 | .600 | - | Cap Clark |
| Centreville Red Sox | 68 | 48 | .586 | 2 | Ed Walls |
| Milford Giants | 72 | 52 | .581 | 2 | Bubber Jonnard |
| Salisbury Cardinals | 65 | 58 | .528 | 8½ | Gus Brittain / Ed Kobesky |
| Federalsburg A's | 57 | 67 | .460 | 17 | Sam Nisonoff / Joe Maynard |
| Cambridge Canners | 52 | 67 | .437 | 19½ | Hugh Poland |
| Easton Yankees | 48 | 69 | .410 | 22½ | Ray Powell |
| Pocomoke City Chicks | 50 | 75 | .400 | 24½ | Poke Whalen |

Playoffs: Milford 3 games, Dover 2. Salisbury 3 games, Centreville 2.
Finals: Salisbury 4 games, Milford 2.

Player statistics
| Player | Team | Stat | Tot | Player | Team | Stat | Tot |
|---|---|---|---|---|---|---|---|
| Lloyd Rice | Federalsburg | BA | .363 | Jorge Comellas | Salisbury | W | 21 |
| Paul Gaulin | Dover | Runs | 102 | Jocko Thompson | Centreville | SO | 268 |
| Bob Maier | Salisbury | Hits | 146 | Jocko Thompson | Centreville | ERA | 1.56 |
| Fred Lutz | Easton | RBI | 81 | Guy Johnson | Dover | PCT | .846 11–2 |
| Ed Kobesky | Salisbury | HR | 18 | | | | |

1941 Eastern Shore League
schedule

| Team standings | W | L | PCT | GB | Managers |
|---|---|---|---|---|---|
| Milford Giants | 66 | 42 | .611 | - | Hal Gruber |
| Cambridge Canners | 61 | 45 | .575 | 4 | Everett Johnston |
| Easton Yankees | 57 | 53 | .518 | 10 | Dallas Warren |
| Centreville Red Sox | 54 | 52 | .509 | 11 | Ed Walls / Eddie Popowski |
| Salisbury Cardinals | 51 | 59 | .464 | 16 | John Wedemeyer / Bob Maier |
| Federalsburg A's | 35 | 73 | .324 | 31 | Joe O'Rourke |

Playoffs: Milford 3 games, Centreville 0. Easton 3 games, Cambridge 0.
Finals: Easton 4 games, Milford 3.

Player statistics
| Player | Team | Stat | Tot | Player | Team | Stat | Tot |
|---|---|---|---|---|---|---|---|
| Gordon McKinnon | Milford | BA | .344 | Bill Boland | Milford | W | 20 |
| Gordon McKinnon | Milford | Runs | 98 | Chris Hayden | Milford | SO | 188 |
| Art Flesland | Milford | Hits | 157 | Joe Ostrowski | Centreville | ERA | 1.71 |
| Art Gunning | Milford | RBI | 67 | Bill Boland | Milford | PCT | .800 20–5 |
| Tommy Koval | Cambridge | HR | 16 | | | | |

=== 1946 to 1949 ===
The league did not play from 1942 through 1945 due to World War II.

1946 Eastern Shore League
schedule

| Team standings | W | L | PCT | GB | Managers |
|---|---|---|---|---|---|
| Centreville Orioles | 88 | 37 | .704 | - | Jim McLeod |
| Milford Red Sox | 77 | 49 | .611 | 11½ | Walter Millies |
| Dover Phillies | 68 | 57 | .544 | 20 | Hank Lehman |
| Salisbury Cardinals | 61 | 64 | .488 | 27 | Hal Contini |
| Easton Yankees | 59 | 66 | .472 | 29 | Jack Farmer |
| Seaford Eagles | 58 | 68 | .460 | 30½ | Walter Youse / Joe Becker |
| Cambridge Dodgers | 53 | 73 | .421 | 35½ | Jimmy Cooney / Barney DeForge |
| Federalsburg A's | 37 | 87 | .298 | 50½ | Lew Krausse Sr. |

Playoffs: Centreville 4 games, Dover 3. Milford 4 games, Salisbury 2.
Finals: Centreville 4 games, Milford 1.

Player statistics
| Player | Team | Stat | Tot | Player | Team | Stat | Tot |
|---|---|---|---|---|---|---|---|
| Sid Langston | Salisbury | BA | .353 | Richard Waldt | Centreville | W | 17 |
| Jimmy Stevens | Centreville | Runs | 132 | Stanley Coulling | Centreville | W | 17 |
| Fred Pacitto | Centreville | Hits | 164 | Mike Gast | Centreville | SO | 182 |
| Don Marshall | Dover | RBI | 110 | Barney DeForge | Cambridge | ERA | 2.48 |
| Don Marshall | Dover | HR | 29 | Mike Gast | Centreville | PCT | .762 16–5 |

1947 Eastern Shore League
schedule

| Team standings | W | L | PCT | GB | Attend | Managers |
|---|---|---|---|---|---|---|
| Cambridge Dodgers | 91 | 34 | .728 | - | 62,118 | Roy Nichols |
| Seaford Eagles | 74 | 49 | .602 | 16 | 54,637 | Bob Westfall |
| Dover Phillies | 68 | 56 | .548 | 22½ | 33,676 | Dick Carter |
| Federalsburg A's | 62 | 63 | .496 | 29 | 29,781 | Pep Rambert |
| Milford Red Sox | 62 | 64 | .492 | 29½ | 29,581 | Walter Millies |
| Rehoboth Beach Pirates | 49 | 75 | .395 | 41 | 30,521 | Gordon McKinnon / Doug Peden |
| Easton Yankees | 48 | 78 | .381 | 43½ | 42,618 | Joe Antolick |
| Salisbury Cardinals | 45 | 80 | .360 | 46 | 51,739 | Harold Contini |

Playoffs: Cambridge 4 games, Dover 3; Seaford 4 games, Federalsburg 0.
Finals: Seaford 4 games, Cambridge 3.

Player Statistics
| Player | Team | Stat | Tot | Player | Team | Stat | Tot |
|---|---|---|---|---|---|---|---|
| Pep Rambert | Federalsburg | BA | .376 | Chris Van Cuyk | Cambridge | W | 25 |
| Bob Stramm | Cambridge | Runs | 129 | Chris Van Cuyk | Cambridge | SO | 279 |
| Bob Stramm | Cambridge | Hits | 162 | Chris Van Cuyk | Cambridge | ERA | 1.93 |
| Tim Thompson | Cambridge | Hits | 162 | Chris Van Cuyk | Cambridge | Pct | .926; 25–2 |
| Ducky Detweiler | Federalsburg | HR | 29 | | | | |
| Ducky Detweiler | Federalsburg | RBI | 133 | | | | |

1948 Eastern Shore League
schedule

| Team standings | W | L | PCT | GB | Attend | Managers |
|---|---|---|---|---|---|---|
| Salisbury Cardinals | 89 | 32 | .736 | - | 59,164 | Gene Corbett |
| Milford Red Sox | 81 | 43 | .653 | 9½ | 21,947 | Clayton Sheedy |
| Easton Yankees | 71 | 50 | .587 | 18 | 37,780 | Dallas Warren |
| Cambridge Dodgers | 65 | 61 | .516 | 26½ | 31,737 | Bob Vickery / Stew Hofferth |
| Rehoboth Beach Pirates | 60 | 65 | .480 | 31 | 21,845 | Doug Peden |
| Seaford Eagles | 56 | 70 | .444 | 35½ | 31,850 | Bob Westfall / Socks Seibold |
| Federalsburg A's | 49 | 76 | .392 | 42 | 22,901 | Ducky Detweiler |
| Dover Phillies | 26 | 100 | .206 | 65½ | 10,079 | Guy Glaser / Grover Wearshing |

Playoffs: Teams played a round-robin series. Cambridge (4–2), Milford (4–3), Easton (3–4), Salisbury (2–4)
Finals: Milford 4 games, Cambridge 1.

Player statistics
| Player | Team | Stat | Tot | Player | Team | Stat | Tot |
|---|---|---|---|---|---|---|---|
| Donald Maxa | Easton | BA | .382 | John Andre | Seaford | W | 21 |
| Norm Zauchin | Milford | Runs | 126 | John Andre | Seaford | SO | 228 |
| Ray Jablonski | Milford | Hits | 172 | Don Black | Salisbury | ERA | 2.23 |
| Norm Zauchin | Milford | RBI | 138 | Herb Moford | Salisbury | PCT | .833 20–4 |
| Norm Zauchin | Milford | HR | 33 | | | | |

1949 Eastern Shore League
schedule

| Team standings | W | L | PCT | GB | Attend | Managers |
|---|---|---|---|---|---|---|
| Easton Yankees | 68 | 52 | .567 | - | 38,651 | Jack Farmer |
| Federalsburg Feds | 63 | 56 | .529 | 4½ | 30,139 | Carl McQuillen |
| Salisbury Cardinals | 60 | 59 | .504 | 7½ | 39,063 | Gene Corbett |
| Rehoboth Beach Sea Hawks | 56 | 63 | .471 | 11½ | 22,358 | Bill Sisler / Johnny Watson |
| Seaford Eagles | 56 | 64 | .467 | 12 | 35,519 | Paul Galin |
| Cambridge Dodgers | 55 | 64 | .462 | 12½ | 29,434 | Merle Strachan |

Playoffs: Teams played a round-robin series. Federalsburg (4–1), Rehoboth Beach (4–2), Easton (2–4), Salisbury (1–4)
Finals: Rehoboth Beach 4 games, Federalsburg 3.

Player statistics
| Player | Team | Stat | Tot | Player | Team | Stat | Tot |
|---|---|---|---|---|---|---|---|
| Gordon Bragg | Easton | BA | .362 | Babe Pinelli | Rehoboth Beach | W | 18 |
| Bob Westfall | Federalsburg | Runs | 126 | John Andre | Rehoboth Beach | SO | 240 |
| Bob Westfall | Federalsburg | Hits | 158 | Duke Markell | Seaford | ERA | 2.17 |
| Bob Westfall | Federalsburg | RBI | 113 | Duke Markell | Seaford | PCT | .909 10–1 |
| Bob Westfall | Federalsburg | HR | 19 | | | | |

== Notable players ==
- Sam Frock - Laurel - 1922 Player/Manager
- John Thomas Kibler - Cambridge - 1922 Player/Manager

== Selected bibliography ==
- The Eastern Shore Baseball League by William Mowbray (1989) remains the most comprehensive source for ESBL history.
- Mike Lambert has published the Eastern Shore League with Arcadia Publishing in April 2010.
- Mike Lambert has published a second book "Eastern Shore League Extra Innings with Arcadia Publishing in April 2023.

== Sources ==
- Baseball Reference – Eastern Shore League (D) Encyclopedia and History
