= Crisfield Crabbers =

- 1922–1937; (1922–1928, 1937); Crisfield, Maryland

Minor league affiliations
- Class: Class D (1922–1928, 1937)
- League: Eastern Shore League (1922–1928, 1937)

Major league affiliations
- Team: New York Giants (1937)

Minor league titles
- League titles (1): 1926

Team data
- Name: Crisfield Crabbers (1922–1928, 1937)
- Ballpark: Crisfield Ball Park (1922–1928); Clarke Park (1937)

The Crisfield Crabbers were a minor league baseball team based in Crisfield, Maryland. The Crisfield Crabbers teams played as exclusively as members of the Class D level Eastern Shore League from 1922 to 1928 and in 1937, winning the 1926 league championship. Crisfield hosted home minor league games at the Crisfield Ball Park and their final season at Clarke Park. The 1937 Crisfield Crabbers were a minor league affiliate of the New York Giants.

== History ==
=== Eastern Shore League 1922–1928 ===
Minor league baseball began in Crisfield, Maryland with the 1922 Crisfield Crabbers, who became charter members of the Class D level Eastern Shore League, which began play as a six–team league. Crisfield joined fellow Eastern Shore League charter members Cambridge Canners, Laurel Blue Hens, Parksley Spuds, Pocomoke City Salamanders and Salisbury Indians in beginning league play on June 12, 1922.

In their first season of play, the Crabbers ended the 1922 season with a record of 36–32, placing third, playing the season under manager Jack Ryan. The Crabbers finished 6.5 games behind the champion Parksley Spuds, as the league held no playoffs. Joe Tagg of Crisfield won the Eastern Shore League batting title, hitting .329.

The "Crabbers" moniker was in reference to local industry, as today, Crisfield is still noted as the greatest crab shipping point in the United States. Crisfield Academy and High School continues to use the "Crabbers" moniker today. The city of Crisfield continues to host the annual Crab Derby.

The 1923 Crisfield Crabbers finished last in the final Eastern Shore League standings. Crisfield ended the 1923 season with a record of 26–47, placing sixth as the Eastern Shore League expanded to eight teams to begin the season. However, the Milford Sandpipers withdrew from the league in a dispute over an ineligible player and the Pocomoke City Salamanders folded during the season. Jack Ryan again served as the Crisfield manager, as the Crabbers finished 24.0 games behind the first place Dover Senators.

The Crisfield Crabbers of the 1924 Eastern Shore League ended the season in fourth place. The Crabbers finished with record of 41–39, as Joseph Riley served as manager. In the six–team league, Crisfield finished the season 5.0 games behind the champion Parksley Spuds.

Continuing Eastern Shore League play, the 1925 Crisfield Crabbers finished in fifth place. The Crabbers ended the 1925 season with a record of 42–48 to place fifth in the six–team Eastern Shore League. Martin Breslin and Herb Armstrong served as managers, as Crisfield finished 9.5 games behind the first place Cambridge Canners.

The 1926 Crisfield Crabbers won the Eastern Shore League championship in the six–team league. The Crisfield Crabbers ended the 1926 Eastern Shore League season with a record of 63–21, to place first in the final standings. With Mike Pasquella serving as manager, Crisfield finished 7.0 games ahead of the second place Salisbury Indians. In league play, the Easton Yankees team was stripped of 34 wins due to roster violations and ended the 1926 season with an official overall record of 24–60.

On August 27, 1926, pitcher William Everham of Crisfield threw a no-hitter against the Salisbury Indians. Crisfield defeated Salisbury 5–0 in the game.

After the conclusion of the 1926 Eastern Shore Season, Crisfield represented the Eastern Shore League in the Five State Championship against the Hagerstown Hubs, champions of the Blue Ridge League. Hagerstown defeated Crisfield 4 games to 2 in the series.

The 1927 Crisfield Crabbers ended the Eastern Shore League regular season with a record of 44–43. The Crabbers placed third in the final standings under returning manager Mike Pasquella, finishing 15.5 games behind the first place Parksley Spuds. Pitcher Cecil Rose of Crisfield led the Eastern Shore League with 17 wins.

The 1928 Eastern Shore League folded during the season. On July 10, 1928, as the league folded, the Crisfield Crabbers had a record of 14–17 under manager Billy Lush. Crisfield was in third place in the standings when the league folded, 8.0 games behind the first place Northampton Red Sox.

=== Eastern Shore League 1937 ===
The Crabbers returned to play for a final season in 1937. The Eastern Shore League resumed play in 1937 with the Crisfield Crabbers becoming a member once again, joining the eight–team league. Crisfield became an affiliate of the New York Giants. The Crabbers ended the 1937 season with a 40–57 record, placing seventh in the regular season, finishing 19.5 games behind the first place Salisbury Indians, who had 21 wins taken away due to roster violations, but still won the pennant. The 1937 Crabbers were managed by Bob Clark and the returning Mike Pasquella in their final season.

The Crisfield franchise folded from the Eastern Shore League following the 1937 season. Crisfield, Maryland has not hosted another minor league team.

== The ballparks ==
From 1922 to 1927, the Crisfield Crabbers teams hosted minor league home games at the Crisfield Ball Park. The ballpark was located on Cove Street at 1st Street & 2nd Street, Crisfield, Maryland.

In 1937, the team resumed play and Crisfield hosted home minor league games at Clarke Park for that season.

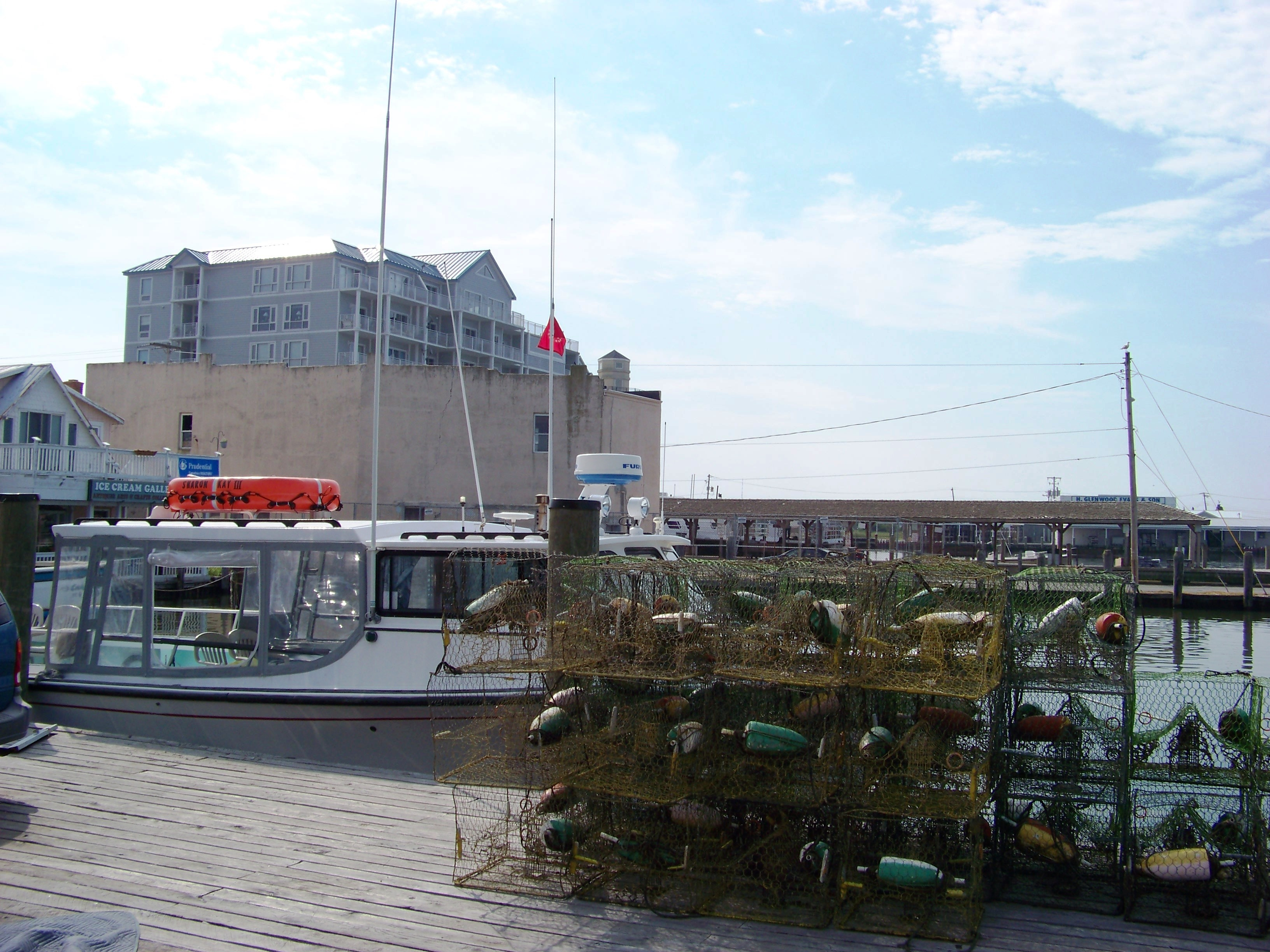
(2007) Chesapeake Bay, Crisfield, MD

== Timeline ==
Year(s)	# Yrs.	Team	Level	League	Affiliate	Ballpark
1922–1928	7	Crisfield Crabbers	Class D	Eastern Shore League	None	Crisfield Ball Park.
1937	1	Crisfield Crabbers	Class D	Eastern Shore League	New York Giants	Clarke Park

== Year–by–year records ==
Year	Record	Finish	Manager	Playoffs/notes
1922	36–32	3rd	Jack Ryan	No playoffs held
1923	26–47	6th	Jack Ryan	No playoffs held
1924	41–39	4th	Joseph Riley	No playoffs held
1925	42–48	5th	Martin Breslin / Herb Armstrong	No playoffs held
1926	63–21	1st	Mike Pasquella	League champions
1927	44–43	3rd	Mike Pasquella	No playoffs held
1928	14–17	3rd	Billy Lush	No playoffs held
1937	40–57	7th	Bob Clark / Mike Pasquella	No playoffs held

== Notable alumni ==
- Vince Barton (1928)
- Alta Cohen (1928)
- Bill Knowlton (1922)
- Billy Lush (1928, MGR)
- Hal Marnie (1937)
- Ralph Mattis (1925)
- John D. Naylor (c. 1922–1923)
- Mike Pasquella (1926–1927, 1936, MGR)
- Paul Richards (1926–1927) Baltimore Orioles Hall of Fame
- Lerton Pinto (1924)
- Tony Rensa (1925–1926)
- Jack Ryan (1922–1923, MGR)
- Rusty Yarnall (1925)

== See also ==
Crisfield Crabbers players
