= Centreville, Maryland minor league baseball history =

Centreville, Maryland minor league baseball teams
- 1937–1946; (1937–1941, 1946); Centreville, Maryland

Minor league affiliations
- Class: Class D (1937–1941, 1946)
- League: Eastern Shore League (1937–1941, 1946)

Major league affiliations
- Team: Boston Red Sox (1937); Philadelphia Phillies (1937–1938); Boston Red Sox (1939–1941); Cleveland Indians (1946)

Minor league titles
- League titles (1): 1946
- Wild card berths (3): 1937; 1939; 1940; 1941

Team data
- Name: Centreville Colts (1937–1939); Centreville Red Sox (1940–1941); Centreville Orioles (1946)
- Ballpark: Centreville Park (1937–1941, 1946)

Minor league baseball teams were based in Centreville, Maryland between 1937 and 1946. Centreville teams played as exclusively as members of the Class D level Eastern Shore League in the 1937–1941 and 1946 seasons.

Centreville was an affiliate of the Philadelphia Phillies in 1937 and 1938, the Boston Red Sox from 1939 to 1941 and the Cleveland Indians in 1946.

== History ==
=== 1937 to 1941: Eastern Shore League ===
Minor league baseball began in Centreville, Maryland in 1937. After disbanding in 1928, the Class D level Eastern Shore League resumed play in 1937 and expanded the league from six franchises to eight.

The 1937 Centreville Colts made the league Finals as they played their initial season, joining the eight–team league and playing as an affiliate of the Boston Red Sox. The Centerville Colts finished fourth in the 1937 Eastern Shore League regular season with a record of 52–43 under Manager Ed O'Rourke. The Colts finished 6.0 games behind the first place Salisbury Indians in the standings. In the playoffs, the Colts defeated the Easton Browns 2 games to 1 to advance to the Finals. In the 1937 Finals, the Salisbury Indians defeated Centreville 3 games to 2. Centreville played home games at Centreville Park, then called Queen Anne County Park. Centreville would play at the ballpark throughout their minor league duration.

With the Eastern Shore League continuing play, the 1938 Centreville Colts placed seventh in the eight–team league, playing as a Philadelphia Phillies minor league affiliate. The Centreville Colts finished the 1938 regular season with a record of 51–60, missing the playoffs and finishing 13.5 games behind the first place Salisbury Indians. Joe O'Rourke was the Colts' manager in 1938.

In 1939, the Colts again became an affiliate of the Boston Red Sox, and qualified for the 1939 Eastern Shore League playoffs. The team ended the 1939 season with a record of 62–60, placing fourth in the regular season standings under manager Cap Clark. (Note: Some sources also list "Dave Coble" as a manager during 1939. It is unclear if that person may be the Dave Coble who played 15 games with the Phillies during 1939 and later managed multiple minor league teams.) The Colts were 21.5 games behind the first place Federalsburg A's. In the Playoffs, the Cambridge Cardinals swept Centreville in three games.

In 1940, Centreville became the Centreville Red Sox. The franchise continued as a Boston Red Sox affiliate, changing monikers after the Pocomoke City Red Sox dropped the "Red Sox" moniker. The Centreville Red Sox ended the Eastern Shore League ended the 1940 season 20 games over .500, with a record of 68–48 losses. Centreville placed second in the regular season standings, 2.0 games behind the Dover Orioles as, Edwin Walls served as the Colts' manager. In the Playoffs, Centreville lost to the Salisbury Cardinals 3 games to 2.

The Centreville Red Sox again qualified for the playoffs in the 1941 Eastern Shore League, which had reduced to six teams after the Dover Orioles and Pocomoke City Chicks franchises folded. Centreville ended the Eastern Shore League 1941 regular season with a record of 54–52 and placed fourth in the standings, 11.0 games behind the pennant winning Milford Giants. Qualifying for the Playoffs under managers Edwin Walls, Lee Wortman and Eddie Popowski, the Milford Giants swept the Red Sox in 3 games. After the 1941 season, the league did not return for the 1942 season due to World War II.

=== 1946: Eastern Shore League ===
In 1946, the Centreville Orioles won the Eastern Shore League Championship in their final season of minor league play. The Class D Eastern Shore League reformed following World War II as an eight-team league, with Dover returning a franchise and the Seaford Eagles joining the league. Centreville became an affiliate of the Cleveland Indians in 1946. Managed by Jim McLeod, Centreville dominated the regular season, finishing 51 games over .500 with an 88–37 record, 11.5 games ahead of second place Milford Red Sox. In the Playoffs Centreville defeated the Dover Phillies 4 games to 3 to advance. In the Eastern Shore League Finals, The Orioles defeated Milford 4 games to 1 to win the championship. On the season, Centreville led the league in offense (815 runs) and were second in pitching/defense (577 runs allowed). Despite the championship, the Centreville franchise folded following the 1946 season and were replaced in the 1947 Eastern Shore League by the Rehoboth Beach Pirates. Minor league baseball has not returned to Centreville.

== The ballpark ==
Centreville teams played home games exclusively at Centreville Park. The ballpark had a capacity of 1,500 (1939) and 2,500 (1946) with dimensions of:

Year	Left	Center	Right
1939	360 feet (110 m)	425 feet (130 m)	262 feet (80 m)
1940	375 feet (114 m)	420 feet (130 m)	265 feet (81 m)

Known as the Queen Anne County Park, the site is still in use as a public park today, although the ballpark was dismantled. The address is SR 898, Old Centreville Road, Centreville, Maryland.

== Centreville timeline ==
Year(s)	# Yrs.	Team	Level	League	Affiliate	Ballpark
1937	1	Centreville Colts	Class D	Eastern Shore League	Boston Red Sox	Centreville Park
1938	1	Centreville Colts	Class D	Eastern Shore League	Philadelphia Phillies	Centreville Park
1939	1	Centreville Colts	Class D	Eastern Shore League	Boston Red Sox	Centreville Park
1940–1941	2	Centreville Red Sox	Class D	Eastern Shore League	Boston Red Sox	Centreville Park
1946	1	Centreville Orioles	Class D	Eastern Shore League	Cleveland Indians	Centreville Park

== Year-by-year record ==
Each season, the top four teams in the Eastern Shore League qualified for the postseason, structured as a bracket tournament.

Year	Record	Finish	Manager	Playoffs (games)
1937	52–43	4th	Ed O'Rourke	defeated Easton Browns in semi-finals (2–1); lost to Salisbury Indians in finals (2–3)
1938	51–60	7th	Joe O'Rourke	did not qualify
1939	62–60	4th	Cap Clark	lost to Cambridge Cardinals in semi-finals (0–3)
1940	68–48	2nd	Ed Walls	lost to Salisbury Cardinals in semifinals (2–3)
1941	54–52	4th	Ed Walls / Eddie Popowski	lost to Milford Giants in semifinals (0–3)
1946	88–37	1st	Jim McLeod	defeated Dover Phillies in semi-finals (4–3); defeated Milford Red Sox in finals (4–1)

== Notable alumni ==
- Cap Clark (1939, MGR)
- Walker Cress (1939)
- Danny Doyle (1940)
- Joe Holden (1938)
- Eddie Feinberg (1937)
- Roy Lee (1939)
- Jim McLeod (1946 Player/MGR)
- Hal Marnie (1938)
- Joe O'Rourke (1937, MGR)
- Joe Ostrowski (1941)
- Mel Parnell (1941)
- Bill Peterman (1940)
- Alex Pitko (1937)
- Eddie Popowski (1941, MGR)
- Ray Stoviak (1938)
- Jocko Thompson (1940)

== See also ==
- Centreville Colts players
- Centreville Orioles players
- Centreville Red Sox players
