= Ralph Mattis =

American baseball player (1890–1960)

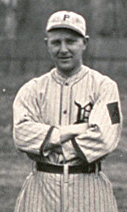
- Mattis as a member of the Pittsburgh Rebels in 1914.
- Outfielder
- Born: August 24, 1890; Philadelphia, Pennsylvania, US
- Died: September 13, 1960 (aged 70); Williamsport, Pennsylvania, US
- Batted: Right Threw: Right

MLB debut
- April 22, 1914, for the Pittsburgh Rebels

Last MLB appearance
- October 9, 1914, for the Pittsburgh Rebels

MLB statistics
- Batting average: .249
- Hits: 21
- Runs batted in: 8
- Stats at Baseball Reference

Teams
- Pittsburgh Rebels (1914)

Ralph Mattis (August 24, 1890 – September 13, 1960), known also as Matty Mattis, was an American professional baseball outfielder whose career spanned seven seasons, one of which was spent in Major League Baseball (MLB) with the Pittsburgh Rebels (1914). In his only season in the majors, Mattis batted .247 with 14 runs scored, 21 hits, four doubles, one triple, and eight runs batted in (RBIs) in 36 games played. The majority of his career was played in the minor leagues. He played with the Richmond Colts (1911), Newport News Shipbuilders (1912), Roanoke Tigers (1913), Parksley Spuds (1923–24), and Crisfield Crabbers (1925) over his career in the minors. Combined between those teams, Mattis batted .303 with 698 hits in 610 games played. During his career, he stood at 5 feet 11 inches (180 cm) and weighed 172 pounds (78 kg). He batted and threw right-handed. Mattis served as a manager for one season with the Parksley Spuds (1923).

== Early life ==
Mattis was born on August 24, 1890, in Roxborough, Philadelphia, Pennsylvania, to Benjamin and Anna Mattis of Pennsylvania and Delaware, respectively. The two had four other children, Frank, Ross, Reed, and Weston. Benjamin Mattis worked as a butcher. In 1909, Ralph Mattis joined the Roxborough semi-professional baseball team, which were members of the Northern Pennsylvania League.

== Early professional baseball career ==
In 1911, Mattis signed with the minor league Richmond Colts of the Class-C Virginia League. With the Colts, Mattis played left field. On May 9, he hit two home runs in the same inning in a game against the Roanoke Tigers. In August, Richmond sold Mattis to the Washington Senators. According to The Indianapolis Star, Washington was just one of many Major League Baseball (MLB) teams that was interested in Mattis. On the season with the Colts, he batted .306 with 140 hits in 124 games played. He finished sixth in the league in hits that year.

Mattis was invited to spring training with the Washington Senators in 1912. Early in spring training, Mattis suffered an injury which caused him miss playing time. The manager of the Georgetown University baseball team allowed Mattis to practice with his team while he was recovering from his injury. Before the start of the regular season, Mattis was sent to the Class-C Virginia League by the Senators. He was assigned to the Newport News Shipbuilder, where he batted .249 with 107 hits, 18 doubles, four triples, and one home run in 118 games played. At the end of the season, The Sheboygan Press called Mattis "the best outfielder in the Virginia League". In 1913, Mattis joined the Class-C Roanoke Tigers of the Virginia League. During mid-season, he was described as one of the best outfielders in the Virginia League by The Washington Post. He batted .300 with 157 hits, 21 doubles, eight triples, and three home runs in 140 games played. Defensively, he played all of his games in the outfield, committing nine errors in 332 total chances. Mattis led the league in hits that season.

== Major League Baseball debut ==
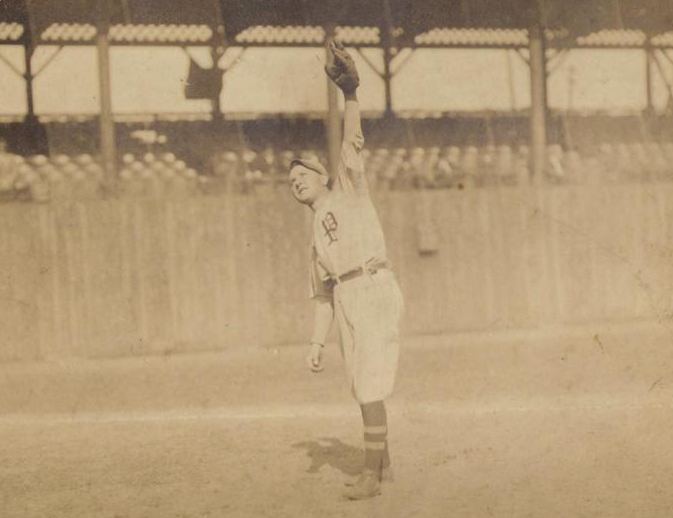
In four plate appearances during his MLB debut on April 22, 1914, Mattis walked, hit a single, double, and triple.

On February 25, 1914, Mattis signed with the major league Pittsburgh Rebels of the newly formed Federal League. He attended spring training with the Rebels that season in Lynchburg, Virginia. The Pittsburgh Press described Mattis as having "shoulders like an ox" and that it is likely he would be a star player for Pittsburgh. The Sporting Life predicted that he would develop into one of the best outfielder is the Federal League. He made his MLB debut on April 22, against the Brooklyn Tip-Tops. In his first career MLB plate appearance during that game, he drew a walk. His first hit came that day, as he got a single, double, and triple in three at-bats. After two months, Mattis was second in the Federal League in batting average with a .406 clip. In June, Mattis received a temporary starting job after the Rebels every-day outfielder Davy Jones suffered an injury. On July 28, Pittsburgh manager Rebel Oakes allowed Mattis to join a semi-professional baseball team in St. Marys, Pennsylvania. He returned to the Rebels that season on September 11. On the season with Pittsburgh, he batted .247 with 14 runs scored, 21 hits, four doubles, one triple, eight runs batted in (RBIs), and two stolen bases in 36 games played. Defensively, Mattis made three errors in 43 total chances in the outfield.

== First retirement ==
Mattis reported to spring training with the Pittsburgh Rebels in 1915. He was competing against Jim Kelly, Mike Menosky, Cy Rheam, Jimmie Savage, and Frank Delahanty for a starting job in the Rebels. The Rebels assigned Mattis to the minor league New Haven White Wings of the Colonial League. However, Mattis retired and never made an appearance with the White Wings in 1915. By 1920, Mattis working as a truck driver, and was living in Haverford Township, Delaware County, Pennsylvania, with his wife, Clare E., and their daughter Edna.

== Return to baseball ==
In 1923, after a nine-year absence, Mattis made his return to professional baseball. He signed with the Class-D Parksley Spuds of the Eastern Shore League. He served as the Spuds' player-manager. During his debut with Parksley on May 27, Mattis forced his team to forfeit in the ninth inning, which The Baltimore Sun called "unsatisfactory". He finished the season with a .369 batting average, which was third in the league. Mattis also compiled 94 hits, 13 doubles, one triples, and 19 home runs in 65 games played. He finished second amongst league batters in hits, and home runs; third in slugging percentage (.651), and total bases (166); and tied for seventh in doubles. Defensively, Mattis played 64 games in the outfield, committing three errors in 133 total chances.

Before the start of the 1924 season, Mattis resigned as the manager for the Parksley Spuds, stating that he wanted to devote all of his time to playing. On June 24, in a game against the Cambridge Canners, Mattis hit a home run during the bottom of the 12^{th} inning to give the Spuds the 2–to–1 victory. On the season, Mattis batted .322 with 91 hits, eight doubles, two triples, and 14 home runs in 73 games played. He finished fifth in the league in batting average, and home runs; and sixth in hits. During all of his games, he appeared as an outfielder. He primarily played center field that season.

Mattis signed with the Class-D Crisfield Crabbers of the Eastern Shore League in 1925. In 90 games played, Mattis batted .311 with 109 hits, 14 doubles, one triple, and 23 home runs. Defensively, he played all of his 90 games in the outfield. He committed four errors in 162 total chances. Mattis finished the season third in the league in home runs, and total bases (194); and fifth in hits, and slugging percentage (.554). That season would later prove to be his final in professional baseball.

== Later life ==
In 1942, Mattis was living in Radnor Township, Delaware County, Pennsylvania, and working for the Philadelphia Electric Company. On September 13, 1960, Mattis died in Williamsport, Pennsylvania. He was buried at Valley Forge Gardens in King of Prussia, Pennsylvania.
