= Pocomoke City Chicks =

- 1937–1940; Pocomoke City, Maryland

Minor league affiliations
- Previous classes: Class D
- League: Eastern Shore League

Major league affiliations
- Previous teams: Brooklyn Dodgers (1937)

Team data
- Previous names: Pocomoke City Chicks (1940); Pocomoke City Red Sox (1937–1939); Pocomoke City Salamanders (1922–1923)

The Pocomoke City Chicks were a minor league baseball team based in Pocomoke City, Maryland. They played in the Class-D Eastern Shore League from 1922 to 1940. In 1922 and 1923, the team was called the Pokomoke City Salamanders. From 1937 to 1939, the team was known as the Pocomoke City Red Sox before changing the name for its final season. They were an affiliate of the Brooklyn Dodgers in 1937.

== Year-by-year record ==
Year	Nickname	Record	Finish	Manager	Playoffs
1922	Salamanders	29-31	5th	Ducky Davis; Sam Frock	
1923	Salamanders	27-37	NA	James Sharp	
1937	Red Sox	42–55	6th	Vic Keen	
1938	Red Sox	41-71	8th	Joe Boley; Wes Kingdon	
1939	Red Sox	43–75	8th	Wes Kingdon (22–41); Jake Flowers (21–34)	
1940	Chicks	50–75	8th	John "Poke" Whalen	
