= Joe Kohlman =

American baseball player (1913-1974)

- Pitcher
- Born: January 28, 1913; Philadelphia, Pennsylvania, U.S.
- Died: March 16, 1974 (aged 61); Philadelphia, Pennsylvania, U.S.
- Batted: Right Threw: Right

MLB debut
- September 26, 1937, for the Washington Senators

Last MLB appearance
- May 26, 1938, for the Washington Senators

MLB statistics
- Win–loss record: 1–0
- Earned run average: 5.27
- Strikeouts: 8
- Stats at Baseball Reference

Teams
- Washington Senators (1937–1938)

Joseph James "Blackie" Kohlman (January 28, 1913 – March 16, 1974) was an American pitcher in Major League Baseball. He played over parts of two seasons (1937–38) with the Washington Senators. He is best known for being the star pitcher of the 1937 Salisbury Indians, going 25–1 for the season.

== Career ==
Kohlman started his professional baseball career in 1935, at the age of 22, for Beckley of the Middle Atlantic League. He went 6-10. Two years later, he had moved down to the Class D Eastern Shore League with the Salisbury Indians. This team became famous for having 21 wins forfeited in the middle of the season, only to come back to win the pennant.

Kohlman was the ace of the pitching staff. In his first start, he took a loss. He then proceeded to win his last 25 decisions of the regular season, clinching the pennant for Salisbury with a no-hitter on September 2. He went 2–1 in the playoffs and won the final game of the championship series with another no-hitter. He led the ESL in wins, strikeouts, and shutouts, and his earned run average was unofficially reported as 1.18. He was also named to the league all-star team and won the Baltimore News-Post's trophy as the Eastern Shore League's Outstanding Player.

Kohlman was sold to the Washington Senators in late 1937 and made two starts for them, pitching a complete game victory. He also started 1938 with the Senators; however, he pitched poorly and was sent down to the South Atlantic League. He went 10-10 for the Greenville Spinners in 1938. From 1939 to 1942, he pitched for seven different minor league teams. He did not return to professional baseball after World War II.

Kohlman died in his hometown of Philadelphia at the age of 61.
