= Jake Flowers =

American baseball player (1902–1962)

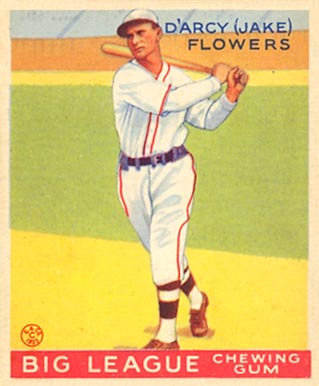
- Infielder
- Born: March 16, 1902; Cambridge, Maryland, U.S.
- Died: December 27, 1962 (aged 60); Clearwater, Florida, U.S.
- Batted: Right Threw: Right

MLB debut
- September 7, 1923, for the St. Louis Cardinals

Last MLB appearance
- August 2, 1934, for the Cincinnati Reds

MLB statistics
- Batting average: .256
- Home runs: 16
- Runs batted in: 201
- Stats at Baseball Reference

Teams
- St. Louis Cardinals (1923, 1926); Brooklyn Robins/Dodgers (1927–1931); St. Louis Cardinals (1931–1932); Brooklyn Dodgers (1933); Cincinnati Reds (1934)

Career highlights and awards
- 2× World Series champion (1926, 1931)

D'Arcy Raymond "Jake" Flowers (March 16, 1902 – December 27, 1962) was an American professional baseball player, coach and manager. A reserve infielder, primarily a second baseman and shortstop, he appeared in 583 Major League games over ten seasons between 1923 and 1934 for the St. Louis Cardinals, Brooklyn Robins and Dodgers, and Cincinnati Reds. The native of Cambridge, Maryland, attended Washington College, where he played football and basketball in addition to baseball. He batted and threw right-handed and was listed at 5 feet 11 inches (1.80 m) tall and 170 pounds (77 kg).

== Baseball career ==
=== As a player ===
In the majors, Flowers played in over 100 games only once: in 1927, for the Robins. He also had his finest offensive season for Brooklyn during the lively-ball 1930 season, when Flowers batted .320 and reached career highs in doubles (18) and runs batted in (50) in only 86 games played. During his two terms with the Cardinals he was a member of two world championship teams, in 1926 and 1931, collecting one hit and one base on balls in 15 World Series plate appearances. During his regular-season big-league career, Flowers batted .256; his 433 hits included 75 doubles, 18 triples and 16 home runs.

=== As a manager, coach, executive and scout ===
After his professional playing career ended in 1936, Flowers returned to the Eastern Shore of Maryland and turned to managing. In his first season, 1937, he won The Sporting News' Minor League Manager of the Year Award. His Salisbury Indians won the Class D Eastern Shore League regular-season pennant with a 59–37 win–loss record, then prevailed over the Centreville Colts in the league playoffs for the undisputed league championship. Salisbury roared off to a 21–5 record during the season's early weeks, but when an ineligible player was discovered on the Indians' roster, the team was forced to forfeit all 21 wins. Undeterred, Flowers' club then won 59 of its last 70 games without the banned player to finish 31/2 games ahead of the second-place Easton Browns. Had the 21 early-season wins not been forfeited, Salisbury would have compiled a winning percentage of .833, good for 135 wins during a 162-game season.

After three seasons in the Eastern Shore League, Flowers returned to the majors to coach under two former Cardinal teammates: Frankie Frisch with the Pittsburgh Pirates (1940–45) and Billy Southworth with the Boston Braves (1946). Flowers then was general manager of the Braves' top farm system affiliate, the Milwaukee Brewers of the American Association, from 1947 to 1950 and a Cleveland Indians coach in 1951–52. He later scouted for the Baltimore Orioles. He suffered a fatal heart attack at age 60 in Clearwater, Florida.

Jake Flowers is a member of the Washington College and Eastern Shore Baseball Foundation halls of fame.

== See also ==
- Salisbury Indians
