= Parksley, Virginia =

- Town
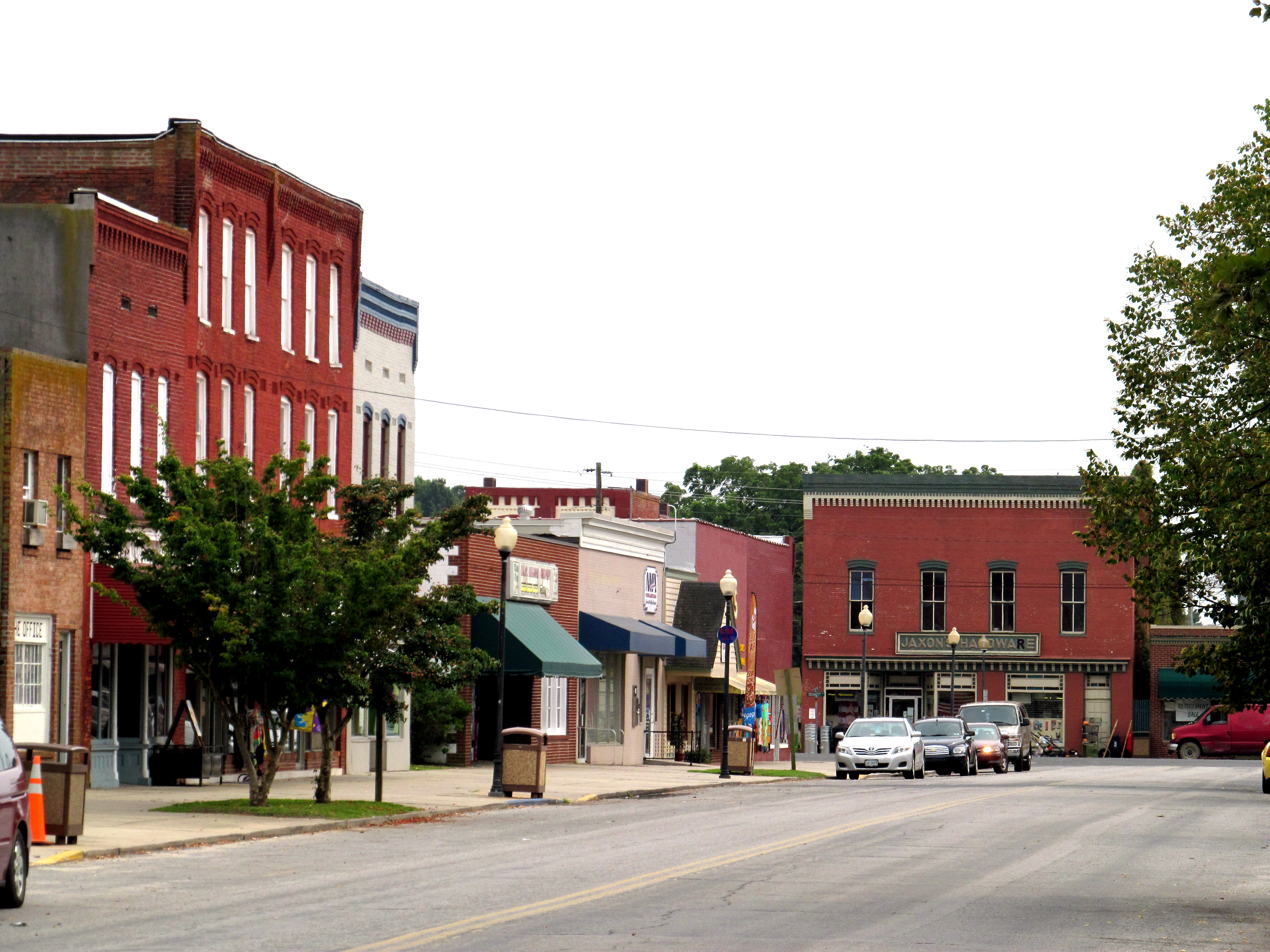
- Dunne Avenue and Bennett Street, the commercial center of Parksley

- Location in Accomack County and the state of Virginia.
- Coordinates: 37°47′6″N 75°39′15″W
- Country: United States
- State: Virginia
- County: Accomack

Area
  - Total: 0.62 sq mi (1.60 km^{2})
  - Land: 0.62 sq mi (1.60 km^{2})
  - Water: 0 sq mi (0.00 km^{2})
- Elevation: 43 ft (13 m)

Population (2020)
  - Total: 816
  - Estimate (2019): 808
  - Density: 1,310.9/sq mi (506.15/km^{2})
- Time zone: UTC−5 (Eastern (EST))
  - Summer (DST): UTC−4 (EDT)
- ZIP code: 23421
- Area code: 757, 948
- FIPS code: 51-60680
- GNIS feature ID: 1497072
- Website: https://www.parksley.org/

Parksley is a town in Accomack County, Virginia, United States. As of the 2020 census, Parksley had a population of 816. It is home to the Eastern Shore Railway Museum.

== Geography ==
Parksley is located at 37°47′6″N 75°39′15″W (37.785078, -75.654222).

According to the United States Census Bureau the town has a total area of 0.6 square mile (1.6 km^{2}), all land.

It lies at an elevation of 43 feet.

== Demographics ==
Historical population
Census	Pop.	Note	%±
1920	601		—
1930	697		16.0%
1940	701		0.6%
1950	883		26.0%
1960	850		−3.7%
1970	903		6.2%
1980	979		8.4%
1990	779		−20.4%
2000	837		7.4%
2010	842		0.6%
2020	816		−3.1%
U.S. Decennial Census

At the 2000 census there were 837 people, 363 households, and 226 families living in the town. The human population density was 1,368.5 people per square mile (529.8/km^{2}). There were 405 housing units at an average density of 662.2 per square mile (256.3/km^{2}). The racial makeup of the town was 82.20% White, 10.75% African American, 0.60% Native American, 0.48% Asian, 4.30% from other races, and 1.67% from two or more races. Hispanic or Latino of any race were 7.65%.

Of the 363 households 27.3% had children under the age of 18 living with them, 47.9% were married couples living together, 11.6% had a female householder with no husband present, and 37.5% were non-families. 32.8% of households were one person and 18.2% were one person aged 65 or older. The average household size was 2.31 and the average family size was 2.87.

The age distribution was 23.3% under the age of 18, 5.9% from 18 to 24, 28.1% from 25 to 44, 21.3% from 45 to 64, and 21.5% 65 or older. The median age was 41 years. For every 100 females there were 86.4 males. For every 100 females aged 18 and over, there were 81.4 males.

The median income for a household in the town was $35,313, and the median family income was $45,227. Males had a median income of $30,909 versus $21,538 for females. The per capita income for the town was $17,855. About 4.8% of families and 6.8% of the population were below the poverty line, including 10.6% of those under age 18 and 2.5% of those age 65 or over.

== History ==
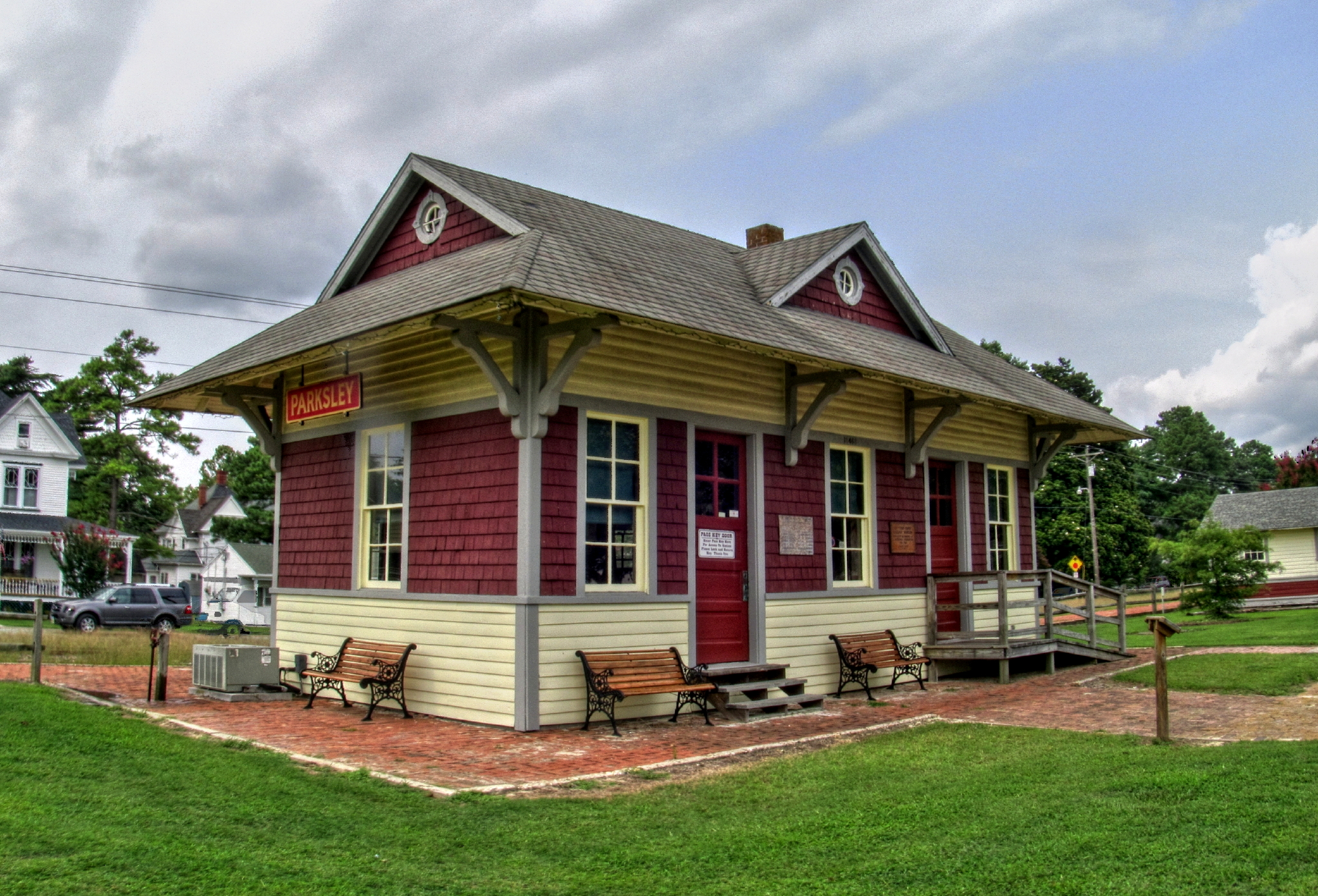
The former Hopeton railroad station, now restored in Parksley as part of the Eastern Shore Railway Museum

The history of Parksley is directly tied to the arrival of the New York, Philadelphia, and Norfolk [NYP&N] Railroad on Virginia's Eastern Shore in the mid-1880s. When the rail line connecting the lower Delmarva Peninsula to the markets of the northeast was built in 1884, several new towns were created along its route which bypassed many of the shore's older established communities. Parksley was the second such planned town on the Virginia shore (after Cape Charles at the railroad's southern terminus in Northampton County) and was laid out in 1885 under the management of the Parksley Land Improvement Company. In 1898, town leaders made an unsuccessful attempt to relocate the county seat from Accomac to the Parksley. The town was incorporated in 1904. During the first half of the 20th century, Parksley became an important shipping point for seafood and agricultural products harvested from the Chesapeake Bay and the Atlantic Ocean in Accomack County. During World War II, Parksley was the site of the Shore National Guard Armory and its airfield was utilized by the Civil Air Patrol, part of military reconnaissance activities guarding the east coast of the United States against possible German invasion. Parksley was home to the Parksley Spuds, a team which played in the Eastern Shore Baseball League.

As of 2021, Parksley has had most of its historic train tracks removed. The removal was approved by the company Canonie Atlantic Co., despite the protests of some locals and New York, Philadelphia and Norfolk Railroad. The removal was approved; the only remaining train tracks in Parksley are associated with the Eastern Shore Railway Museum.

== Economy ==
The local economy of Parksley is dominated by the agriculture industry; both Perdue Farms and Tyson Foods operate large chicken processing facilities in Parksley.

== Transportation ==
=== Major highway ===
- SR 176

=== Public transportation ===
STAR Transit provides public transit services, linking Parksley with Onley, Oak Hall, and other communities in Accomack and Northampton counties.
