= Joe Becker (baseball) =

American baseball player (1908–1998)

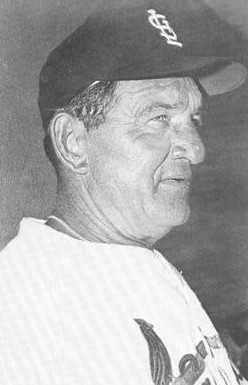
- Becker in 1965
- Catcher
- Born: June 25, 1908; St. Louis, Missouri, U.S.
- Died: January 11, 1998 (aged 89); Sunset Hills, Missouri, U.S.
- Batted: Right Threw: Right

MLB debut
- May 10, 1936, for the Cleveland Indians

Last MLB appearance
- September 14, 1937, for the Cleveland Indians

MLB statistics
- Batting average: .241
- Home run: 1
- Runs scored: 8
- Stats at Baseball Reference

Teams
- As player: Cleveland Indians (1936–1937); As coach: Brooklyn/Los Angeles Dodgers (1955–1964); St. Louis Cardinals (1965–1966); Chicago Cubs (1967–1970)

Career highlights and awards
- 3× World Series champion (1955, 1959, 1963)

Joseph Edward Becker (June 25, 1908 – January 11, 1998) was an American catcher in Major League Baseball who played in 40 games for the Cleveland Indians in 1936–37. He was born in St. Louis, Missouri.

Becker started his professional career in the St. Louis Cardinals minor league system, and played for various clubs between 1930 and 1933. After not playing in 1934, he spent 1935 with the San Francisco Seals. He was then picked up by the Cleveland Indians, and played for them for two seasons. In his major league career, he played in 40 games and had a .241 batting average. His 20 hits included five doubles, two triples, and one home run, which came against Jim Henry of the Boston Red Sox at Fenway Park on June 2, 1936. He was credited with 13 runs batted in.

== Manager and pitching coach ==
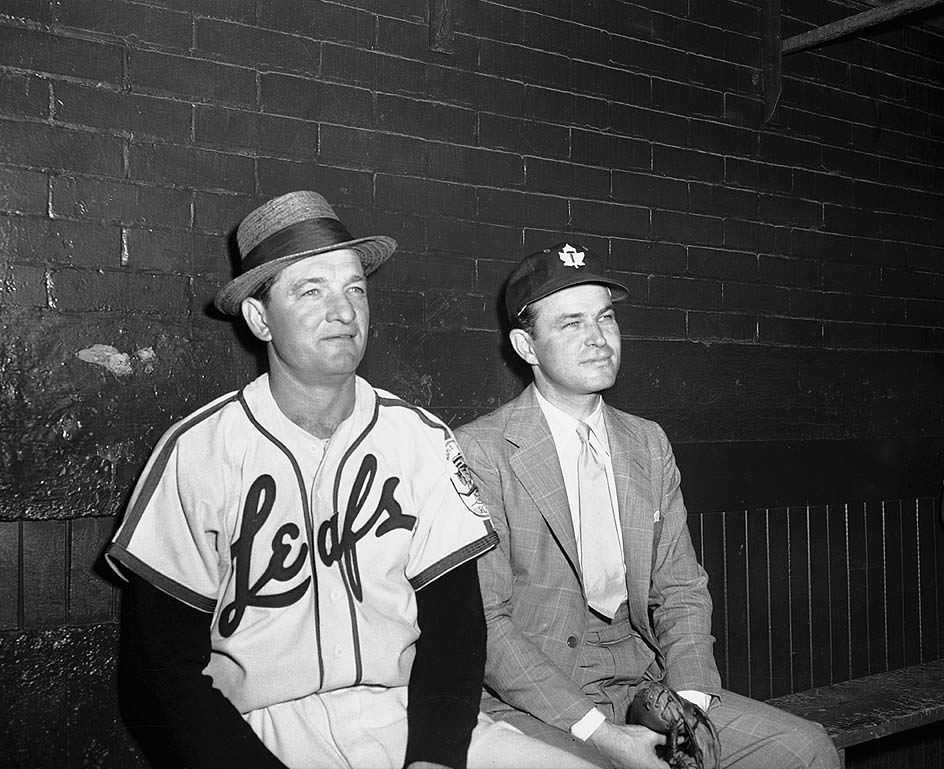
Becker (left) swaps hats with Toronto Maple Leafs owner Jack Kent Cooke. Becker managed the Leafs of the Triple-A International League in 1951–52.

After serving in the United States Navy during World War II, Becker managed in the minor leagues from 1946–54, including stints with the Triple-A Toronto Maple Leafs, Jersey City Giants and Charleston Senators.

Between 1955 and 1970, Becker was a pitching coach in the National League for the Brooklyn / Los Angeles Dodgers (1955–64), St. Louis Cardinals (1965–66) and Chicago Cubs (1967–70). A member of the relatively small fraternity of former catchers who became celebrated throughout baseball as pitching coaches (which included men such as Ray Berres, Dave Duncan, Rube Walker and Mike Roarke), Becker worked for four NL championship Dodger clubs, including the 1955, 1959 and 1963 world champions. He also doubled as the Dodgers' first-base coach during the early 1960s.

Becker's coaching career ended in August 1970, when he was felled by a heart ailment while in uniform for the Cubs at Wrigley Field, forcing his retirement at age 62. He survived his 1970 illness, and died on January 11, 1998, at age 89 in Sunset Hills, Missouri.

Sporting positions
Preceded by Ted Lyons	Brooklyn/Los Angeles Dodgers pitching coach 1955–1964	Succeeded by Lefty Phillips
Preceded by Howie Pollet	St. Louis Cardinals pitching coach 1965–1966	Succeeded by Billy Muffett
Preceded by Fred Fitzsimmons	Chicago Cubs pitching coach 1967–1970	Succeeded by Herman Franks
