= Wes Kingdon =

American baseball player

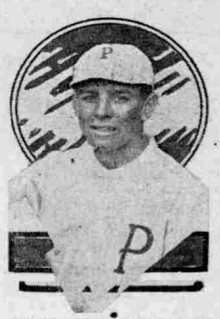
- Infielder
- Born: July 4, 1900; Los Angeles, California, U.S.
- Died: April 19, 1975 (aged 74); San Juan Capistrano, California, U.S.
- Batted: Right Threw: Right

MLB debut
- June 12, 1932, for the Washington Senators

Last MLB appearance
- August 4, 1932, for the Washington Senators

MLB statistics
- Batting average: .324
- Home runs: 0
- Runs batted in: 3
- Stats at Baseball Reference

Teams
- Washington Senators (1932)

Westcott William Kingdon (July 4, 1900 – April 19, 1975) was an American infielder in Major League Baseball. He played for the Washington Senators in 1932.
