= Socks Seibold =

American baseball player

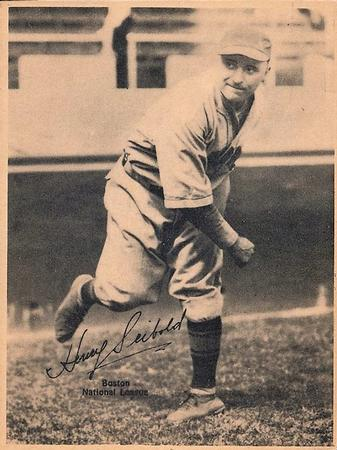
- Pitcher
- Born: May 31, 1896; Philadelphia, Pennsylvania, U.S.
- Died: September 21, 1965 (aged 69); Philadelphia, Pennsylvania, U.S.
- Batted: Right Threw: Right

MLB debut
- September 18, 1915, for the Philadelphia Athletics

Last MLB appearance
- June 13, 1933, for the Boston Braves

MLB statistics
- Win–loss record: 48–86
- Earned run average: 4.43
- Strikeouts: 296
- Stats at Baseball Reference

Teams
- Philadelphia Athletics (1915–1917, 1919); Boston Braves (1929–1933)

Harry "Socks" Seibold (May 31, 1896 – September 21, 1965) was an American professional baseball pitcher. He played in Major League Baseball (MLB) for the Philadelphia Athletics and Boston Braves.

Seibold debuted in 1915 with the Athletics as a shortstop, but was converted to pitcher in 1916. He played parts of 1916, 1917, and 1919 for the Athletics, and then spent the next nine years out of the major leagues. Seibold resurfaced in 1929 with the Boston Braves. For four seasons, he was a regular in the Braves' rotation, and in 1930 set his career high in innings pitched with 250, wins with 15 and strikeouts with 70. His last season came with the Braves in 1933.

A corporal with the United States Army during World War I, Seibold was buried at the Beverly National Cemetery in Beverly, New Jersey.
