= Parksley Spuds =

- 1922–1928; Parksley, Virginia

Minor league affiliations
- Previous classes: Class D
- League: Eastern Shore League

Minor league titles
- League titles: 3 (1922, 1924, 1927)

Team data
- Previous parks: Eastern Shore League Baseball Park

The Parksley Spuds was a Class D minor league baseball team based in Parksley, Virginia, which had a population of just over 600 people at the 1920 United States census. They played in the Eastern Shore League between 1922 and 1928, the entire run of the league's initial incarnation. The Spuds won multiple league pennants during that span. The league encountered financial difficulties during the 1928 season and the owners of the teams voted to disband the league.

One of the notable players to appear for the Spuds was Jimmie Foxx; he was a catcher for the team during its visit to a 1924 championship series known as the Five-State Championship. He later became a Baseball Hall of Fame first baseman.

== History ==
The Parksley Spuds became one of the six inaugural members of the Eastern Shore League in 1922. The league consisted of teams from Virginia, Maryland and Delaware. The Spuds were named so for the fact that sweet potatoes were widely grown in Parksley. Parksley was home to a playing field known as the Eastern Shore League Baseball Park. The rural town of Parksley, which had a population of 607 at the 1920 census, was an unlikely candidate to host a successful baseball team. Accomack County had a population of nearly 35,000 people, but games were played during the daytime and most of the area's population worked long hours.

In the 1922 season, the Spuds were managed by former minor league player John "Poke" Whalen. Parksley won the Eastern Shore League pennant. They finished with a 42–25 win–loss record, bolstered by the 15–5 record of pitcher William Klingelhoefer. The championship teams from the ESL and Blue Ridge League (BRL) faced each other in a playoff known as the Five-State Championship or Five-State Series. Each team in the series was allowed to add two players to its roster from other teams in its league. The Spuds faced the BRL champions, the Martinsburg Blue Sox, in the Five-State Championship that year. Martinsburg won the best-of-seven series in four games.

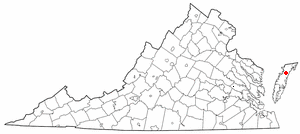
Parksley, Virginia

Ralph Mattis became the player-manager for the Spuds in 1923. He played one more season for the team in 1924, but Whalen returned to manage the team in 1924 and 1925. The Spuds went back to the Five-State Championship in 1924, for which they added the services of future Baseball Hall of Fame member Jimmie Foxx, who had played for the league's Easton Farmers that season. Parksley planned to use Foxx in the outfield, but catcher Joe Tagg got sick just before the series started; Foxx batted fifth and played catcher. He registered six runs batted in (RBI) in the first game, which Parksley won 17–0. Foxx hit for a .391 batting average and four home runs in the series, which the Spuds won four games to two. The Spuds nearly returned to the Five-State Championship in 1925, but the Cambridge Canners finished ahead of them for the Eastern Shore League pennant.

Win Clark managed the 1926 Parksley team. Lester Bangs, who had managed for two years in the Class B Virginia League, was the Spuds manager in 1927. The team won its last league championship that year and beat the BRL's Chambersburg Maroons in the Five-State Championship. A man named John Pasquella took over as manager of the team in 1928; Baseball-Reference.com does not have any biographical information about Pasquella other than his position as manager of the 1928 Parksley team. Facing declining attendance figures, Eastern Shore League officials voted to disband the league in July 1928, cancelling all of the statistics from that season. Two other iterations of the league existed in the 1930s and 1940s, but Parksley did not field a team in the league after 1928.
