= John André (baseball) =

American baseball player (1923–1976)

- Pitcher
- Born: January 3, 1923; Brockton, Massachusetts, U.S.
- Died: November 25, 1976 (aged 53); Centerville, Massachusetts, U.S.
- Batted: Left Threw: Right

MLB debut
- April 16, 1955, for the Chicago Cubs

Last MLB appearance
- July 16, 1955, for the Chicago Cubs

MLB statistics
- Win–loss record: 0–1
- Earned run average: 5.80
- Strikeouts: 19
- Stats at Baseball Reference

Teams
- Chicago Cubs (1955)

John Edward André (January 3, 1923 – November 25, 1976) was an American Major League Baseball pitcher for the Chicago Cubs in the 1955 season. Born in Brockton, Massachusetts, the Filipino-American André was signed by the New York Giants as an amateur free agent in 1946. He languished in the minor leagues for years before being purchased by the Cubs from a club in Shreveport. André made his major league debut at the unusually advanced age of 32 on April 16, 1955, and went on to appear in 22 games, including 3 starts. He managed a record of just 0–1 with one save in those 22 games, posting a 5.80 ERA. André's final major league game was on July 16, 1955.

André died in Centerville, Massachusetts.
