= Joe O'Rourke =

American baseball player (1904-1990)

- Pinch hitter
- Born: October 28, 1904; Philadelphia, Pennsylvania, U.S.
- Died: June 27, 1990 (aged 85); Philadelphia, Pennsylvania, U.S.
- Batted: Left Threw: Right

MLB debut
- April 19, 1929, for the Philadelphia Phillies

Last MLB appearance
- June 5, 1929, for the Philadelphia Phillies

MLB statistics
- Games played: 3
- At bats: 3
- Hits: 0
- Stats at Baseball Reference

Teams
- Philadelphia Phillies (1929)

Joseph Leo O'Rourke Jr. (October 28, 1904 – June 27, 1990) was an American pinch hitter in Major League Baseball. He played for the Philadelphia Phillies in 1929. O'Rourke was the son of Phillies' scout Patsy O'Rourke and went to spring training with the Phillies in 1929 as a second baseman who could also play shortstop and third base. He would play second base for the Phillies in a September 1931 exhibition game against the Athletics.

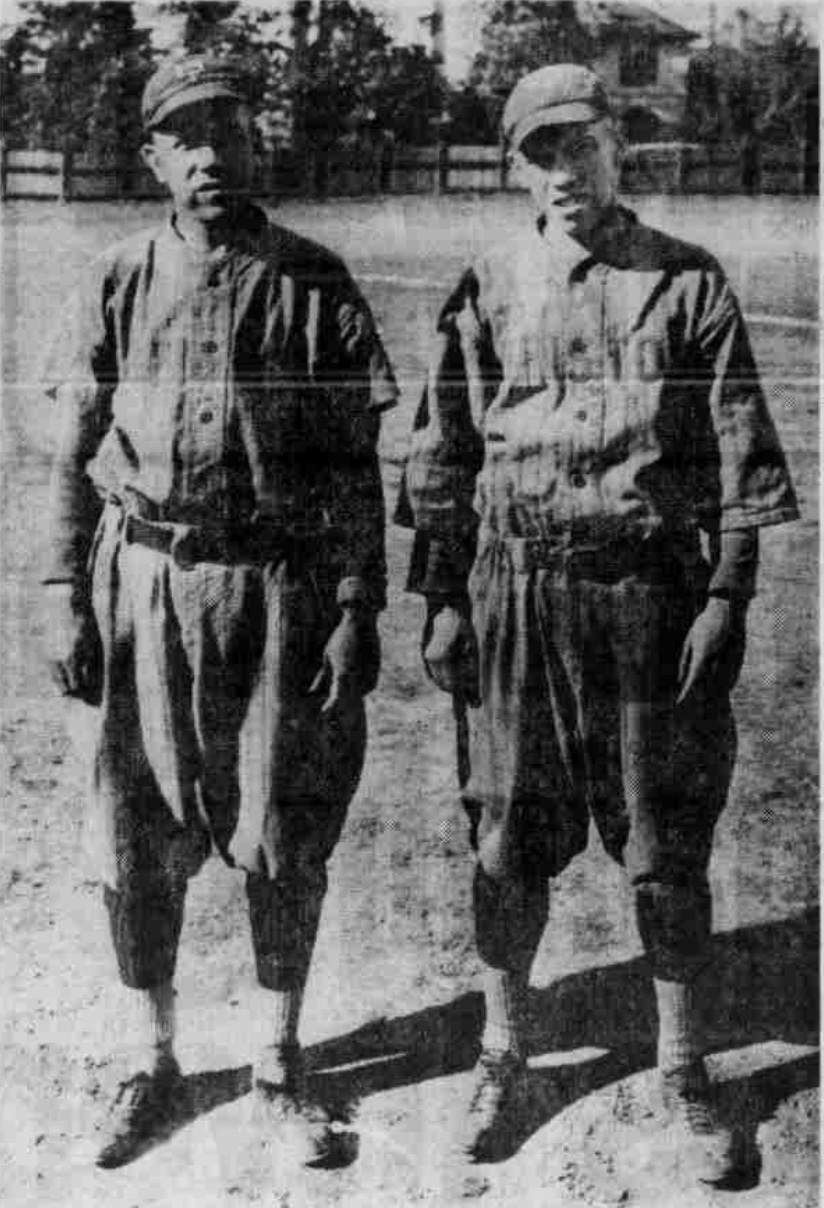
Patsy (L) and Joe O'Rourke (R) in 1924 with Bristol, Appalachian League for which Patsy managed, and Joe Jr played infield

O'Rourke's playing career was limited due to a broken jaw. He became a scout in 1936 and would work for the Chicago White, Philadelphia Athletics, Kansas City Athletics, and Washington Senators before his retirement in 1967. O'Rourke ran O'Rourke's Shortstop Cafe in Philadelphia's Port Richmond neighborhood from 1982 until his death in 1990. He remained a life long baseball fan who followed the Phillies closely in retirement although he was reported not to have been a fan of the team's Veterans Stadium due to its large size.
