= Sam Frock =

American baseball player (1882–1925)

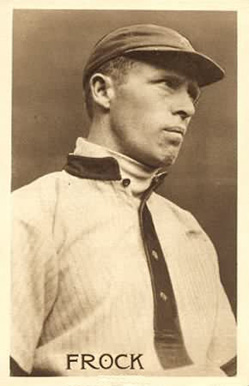
- Pitcher
- Born: December 23, 1882; Baltimore, Maryland, U.S.
- Died: November 3, 1925 (aged 42); Baltimore, Maryland, U.S.
- Batted: Right Threw: Right

MLB debut
- September 21, 1907, for the Boston Doves

Last MLB appearance
- May 6, 1911, for the Boston Rustlers

MLB statistics
- Win–loss record: 15–23
- Earned run average: 3.23
- Strikeouts: 202
- Stats at Baseball Reference

Teams
- Boston Doves (1907); Pittsburgh Pirates (1909–1910); Boston Doves/Rustlers (1910–1911)

Career highlights and awards
- World Series champion (1909)

Samuel William Frock (December 23, 1882 – November 3, 1925) was an American professional baseball player who played four Major league seasons between 1907 and 1911. He was born in Baltimore, Maryland and died there at the age of 42.
