= Easton, Maryland minor league baseball history =

Easton, Maryland minor league baseball teams
- 1924–1949; (1924–1928, 1937–1941, 1946–1949); Easton, Maryland

Minor league affiliations
- Class: Class D (1924–1928, 1937–1941, 1946–1949)
- League: Eastern Shore League (1924–1928, 1937–1941, 1946–1949)

Major league affiliations
- Team: St. Louis Browns (1937–1938); New York Yankees (1939–1941, 1946–1949)

Minor league titles
- League titles (1): 1941
- Conference titles (1): 1949
- Wild card berths (3): 1937; 1941; 1948

Team data
- Name: Easton Farmers (1924–1928); Easton Browns (1937); Easton Cubs (1938); Easton Yankees (1939–1941, 1946–1949)
- Ballpark: Federal Park (1924–1928, 1937–1941, 1946–1949)

Minor league baseball teams were based in Easton, Maryland between 1924 and 1949. Easton teams played as exclusively as members of the Class D level Eastern Shore League from 1924 to 1928, 1937 to 1941 and 1946 to 1949.

Easton was a minor league affiliate of the St. Louis Browns in 1937 and 1938 and the New York Yankees from 1939 to 1941 and 1946 to 1949.

Baseball Hall of Fame members Frank Home Run Baker and Jimmie Foxx both played for the 1924 Easton Farmers after Baker signed the 16–year old Foxx in his role as player/manager for Easton. Baker returned as the Easton manager in 1925.

== History ==
=== 1924 to 1928: Eastern Shore League ===
Minor league baseball began in Easton, Maryland with the 1924 Easton Farmers, who became members of the Class D Eastern Shore League. Easton played home games at Federal Field, which would remain as the home to all Easton minor league teams. The Easton Farmers of the Eastern Shore League ended the 1924 season with a record of 23–57, finishing last in the six–team league, 23.0 games behind the Parksley Spuds. Future Baseball Hall of Fame member Frank "Home Run" Baker served as player/manager, hitting .293 with 6 home runs in 43 games in his final season as a player at age 38.

Baker, a former star for the Philadelphia Athletics, signed a 16–year old Jimmie Foxx to play for Easton in 1924. Baker had heard about Foxx, who was a star athlete in Sudlersville, Maryland, about 35 miles from Easton. A future Hall of Fame member, Foxx was a junior in high School when he joined the Farmers in 1924. Under the tutelage of Baker, Foxx was sold by Baker to sign with Connie Mack and the Philadelphia Athletics before the end of the 1924 season, making his major league debut in 1925. Foxx hit .296 with 10 home runs for Easton in 1924. In one home game, with major league baseball Commissioner Kenesaw Mountain Landis in attendance, Foxx received a standing ovation before hitting one of the longest home runs at Federal Park. Foxx went on to hit 534 home runs, with a .325 batting average in his major league career.

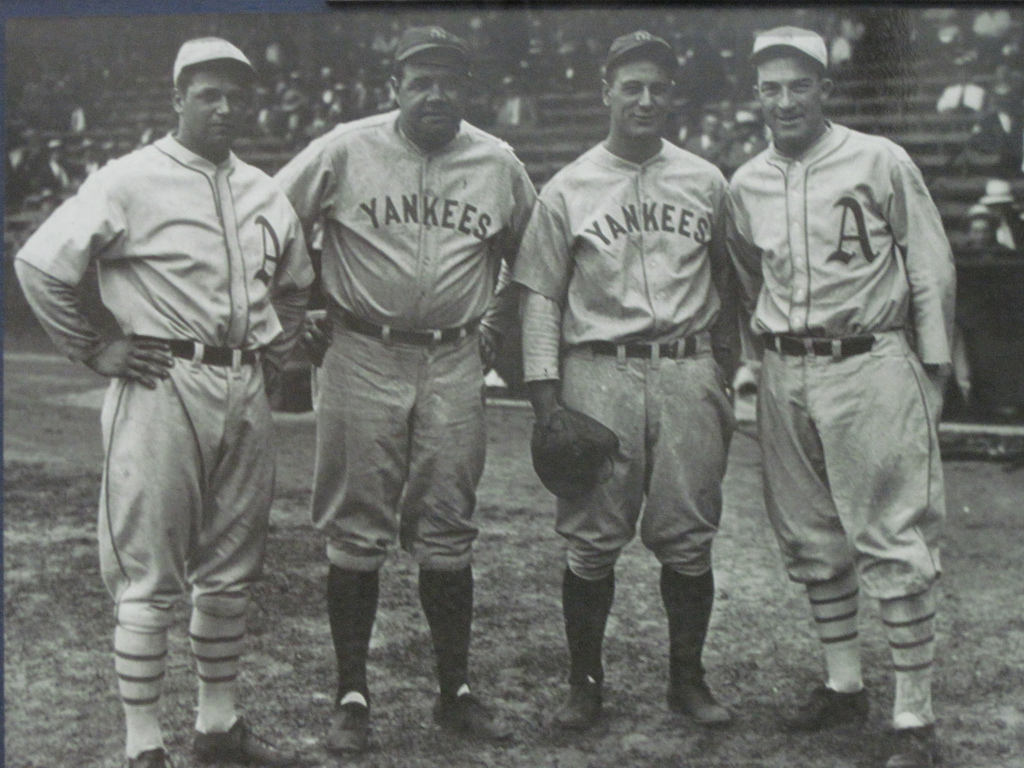
Jimmie Foxx, Babe Ruth, Lou Gehrig, Al Simmons

Easton continued play in the 1925 Eastern Shore League, finishing last with a 36–53 record. The Easton Farmers placed sixth in the Eastern Shore League, finishing 15.0 games behind the first place Cambridge Canners under managers Home Run Baker, Charles Gault and Buck Herzog. Baker was reportedly fired due to not receiving enough money for selling Jimmie Foxx to Baker's former team, the Philadelphia Athletics.

The 1926 Easton Farmers finished last again in the six–team Eastern Shore League, after being stripped of wins due to roster violations. Easton ended the 1926 season with an official overall record of 24–60. Easton had 34 wins reversed on August 19, 1926, due to roster violations. The Eastern Shore League roster rules stipulated that a team could not have more than three "class" players on their roster at any given time. "Class" was defined as any player who had participated a certain number of professional games above the Class D level. A "class" player could not have been in more than 25 games as a position player or 15 games as a pitcher at a level higher than a Class D classification. Violators were subject to forfeit. Buck Herzog served as the 1926 manager as Easton finished 39.0 games behind the first place Crisfield Crabbers.

The 1927 Easton Farmers ended the Eastern Shore League regular season with a record of 36–48. Easton avoided a third-consecutive last place finish by placing fifth in the six–team standings. Easton finished 22.0 games behind the first place Parksley Spuds and 6.5 games ahead of the sixth place Northampton Red Sox. Ted Cather and Jiggs Donahue were the Easton managers in 1927.

The 1928 Eastern Shore League folded during the season. On July 10, 1928, as the league folded, the Easton Farmers had a record of 13–20 under manager Dan Pasquella. Easton was in fifth place in the standings when the league folded, finishing 10.0 games behind the first place Northampton Red Sox.

=== 1937 to 1941: Eastern Shore League ===
The Eastern Shore League resumed play in 1937, with Easton becoming a member and joining the eight–team league. The Easton Browns returned to play as a minor league affiliate of the St. Louis Browns. Playing under manager George Jacobs, the Browns qualified for the Eastern Shore League playoffs. Easton ended the 1937 season with a 56–41 record, placing second in the regular season, finishing 3.5 games behind the Salisbury Indians. Salisbury had 21 wins taken away due to roster violations, but still won the pennant. In the 1937 playoffs, the Centreville Colts defeated Easton 2 games to 1.

The 1938 Easton Cubs continued Eastern Shore League play and placed sixth in the eight–team league. Continuing as a St. Louis Browns affiliate despite the moniker change, Easton ended the 1938 regular season with a 55–56 record, finishing 9.0 games behind the first place Salisbury Indians, with George Jacobs serving as manager.

Easton became the Easton Yankees in the 1939 Eastern shore League after becoming an affiliate of the New York Yankees. Easton's association with the Yankees continued for the remaining duration of the franchise. The Easton Yankees ended the season with a 51–68 record, placing sixth, finishing 31.0 games behind the first place Federalsburg A's. Ray Powell was the 1939 manager. Playing at Federal Park, Easton's home season attendance was 32,000, an average of 538 per home game.

The 1940 Easton Yankees placed seventh in the Eastern Shore League season. With a 48–69 record, under returning manager Ray Powell, Easton finished 22.0 games behind the first place Dover Orioles and 2.0 games ahead of the eighth place Pocomoke City Chicks.

The Easton Yankees were the 1941 Eastern Shore League Champions. The Yankees ended Eastern Shore League regular season with a record of 57–53. Easton placed third in the six–team league, finishing 10.0 games behind the Milford Giants. In the Playoffs Easton Yankees swept the Cambridge Cardinals in three games to advance. In the Finals, the Easton Yankees defeated the Milford Giants 4 games to 3 to claim the championship under the direction of manager Dallas Warren served. The league did not return for the 1942 season.

=== 1946 to 1949: Eastern Shore League ===
In 1946, the Easton Yankees returned to Eastern Shore League play as the league reformed following World War II. Easton ended the 1946 season with a record of 59–66, placing fifth in the eight–team league 29.0 games behind the Centreville Orioles, as Jack Farmer managed the team.

The Easton Yankees of the Eastern Shore League ended the 1947 season with a record of 48–78. Easton placed seventh in the standings, finishing 43.5 games behind the first place Cambridge Dodgers as Joe Antolick served as player/manager. Federal Park saw season attendance of 42,618, an average of 676 per game.

The 1948 Easton Yankees ended the season with a record of 71–50. Easton placed third in the league standings under manager Dallas Warren. Easton finished 18.0 games behind the first place Salisbury Cardinals. Easton was 3–4 in the round robin playoff format and did not advance to the Finals.

In their final Season of play, the Easton Yankees won the 1949 Eastern Shore League pennant. The Easton Yankees of the Eastern Shore League ended the 1949 season with a record of 68–52, placing first in the Eastern Shore League Standings. Easton finished 4.5 games ahead of the second place Federalsburg Feds as Jack Farmer served as manager. Easton was eliminated with a 2–4 record in the round robin playoff format. The Eastern Shore League permanently folded after the 1949 season.

Easton, Maryland has not hosted another minor league team. Today, the Home Run Baker Little League organization still sponsors organized youth games with a name that pays homage to Frank Baker. The youth league is based in neighboring St. Michaels, Maryland and the Easton Little League is one of six local leagues in the organization.

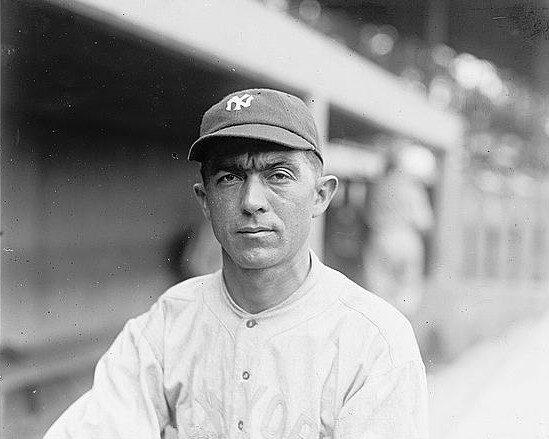
Frank Baker

== The ballpark ==
Easton minor league teams hosted minor league home games exclusively at Federal Park in Easton. With a capacity of 1,900, the ballpark had dimensions of 300–375–310 (1939); 330–400–320 (1940). Federal Park was located at Federal Street & Hammond Street, Easton, Maryland. Today, the former ballpark site is the location of St. Mark's Village, a residential area.

== Timeline ==
Year(s)	# Yrs.	Team	Level	League	Affiliate	Ballpark
1924–1928	5	Easton Farmers	Class D	Eastern Shore League	None	Federal Park
1937	1	Easton Browns	Class D	Eastern Shore League	St. Louis Browns	Federal Park
1938	1	Easton Cubs	Class D	Eastern Shore League	St. Louis Browns	Federal Park
1939–1941	3	Easton Yankees	Class D	Eastern Shore League	New York Yankees	Federal Park
1946–1949	4	Easton Yankees	Class D	Eastern Shore League	New York Yankees	Federal Park

== Notable alumni ==
- Home Run Baker (1924–1925, player/MGR) Inducted Baseball Hall of Fame, 1955
- Jimmie Foxx (1924) Inducted Baseball Hall of Fame, 1951
- Joe Antolick (1947, player/MGR)
- Wally Burnette (1949)
- Ted Cather (1926)
- Joe Cicero (1927)
- Allie Clark (1941)
- Joe Collins (1939)
- George Durning (1925)
- Ferd Eunick (1925)
- Bill Hohman (1925–1926)
- Bill Kennedy (1939)
- Karl Kolseth (1925)
- Charlie Metro (1937)
- Joe Murray (baseball) (1940)
- Jim Picken (1927)
- Ed Sauer (1940)
- Don Savage (1939)
- Steve Souchock (1939)
- Mickey Vernon (1937) 7x MLB All-Star; 2x AL Batting Title
- Yam Yaryan (1939)

== See also ==
- Easton Browns players
- Easton Farmers players
- Easton Yankees players
