= Dover Phillies =

- 1923–1948; (1923–1925, 1937–1940, 1946–1948); Dover, Delaware

Minor league affiliations
- Previous classes: Class-D
- Previous leagues: Delaware State League (1889); Eastern Shore League (1923–1925, 1937–1940, 1946–1948)

Major league affiliations
- Previous teams: Philadelphia Phillies (1946–1948)

Minor league titles
- League titles: 1923

Team data
- Previous names: Dover (1889); Dover Phillies (1946–1948); Dover Orioles (1937–1940); Dover Senators (1926); Dover Dobbins (1925); Dover Senators (1923–1924)

The Dover Phillies were a minor league baseball team that played in Dover, Delaware, as part of the Eastern Shore League. Dover first played in 1889 as members of the Delaware State League. The Eastern Shore League team began as the Dover Senators (or Dobbins) from 1923–1926 and then returned as the Dover Orioles (an affiliate of the Baltimore Orioles of the International League) from 1937–1940. Then after World War II they became a Philadelphia Phillies affiliate from 1946–1948.
