= Milford Red Sox =

- 1923–1948; (1923, 1938–1941, 1944–1948); Milford, Delaware

Minor league affiliations
- Previous classes: Class-D
- Previous leagues: Delaware State League (1889); Eastern Shore League (1923, 1938–1941, 1944–1948)

Major league affiliations
- Previous teams: Boston Red Sox (1946–1948); New York Giants (1938–1941)

Minor league titles
- League titles: 1948

Team data
- Previous names: Milford (1889); Milford Red Sox (1946–1948); Milford Giants (1938–1941); Milford Sandpipers (1923)

The Milford Red Sox was the primary moniker a minor league baseball team that played in Milford, Delaware as members of the Eastern Shore League. After Milford first hosted a team in the 1889 Delaware State League, the Eastern Shore team originated as the Milford Sandpipers (1923), followed by the Milford Giants, a Class-D affiliate of the New York Giants in 1938 and remained that way until the league shut down as a result of World War II in 1942. Milford returned to play after the war, in 1946, as a Boston Red Sox affiliate and played until 1948.

== Notable players ==
- Sid Gordon (1917–1975), 2x Major League All Star
