= Cambridge Dodgers =

- 1922–1949; (1922–1928, 1937–1941, 1946–1949); Cambridge, Maryland

Minor league affiliations
- Previous classes: Class D
- League: Eastern Shore League

Major league affiliations
- Previous teams: Brooklyn Dodgers (1946–1949); St. Louis Cardinals (1937–1941)

Minor league titles
- League titles: 2 (1925, 1939)

Team data
- Previous names: Cambridge Dodgers (1946–1949); Cambridge Canners (1940–1941); Cambridge Cardinals (1937–1939); Cambridge Canners (1922–1928)

The Cambridge Dodgers were a "Class D" Minor League Baseball team, based in Cambridge, Maryland that played in the Eastern Shore League from 1946 to 1949 as an affiliate of the Brooklyn Dodgers. Before World War II, they were an affiliate of the St. Louis Cardinals from 1937 to 1941 as the Cambridge Cardinals. A previous version of the team, the Cambridge Canners, played from 1922 to 1928.

Don Zimmer's first pro team were the 1949 Cambridge Dodgers; he remained in a baseball uniform until his death in 2014, most recently as a senior advisor to the Tampa Bay Rays. (Zimmer's teammate in Cambridge, Joe Pignatano, also played in the major leagues and was a coach for many years thereafter.)

== Notable alumni ==
- Jake Flowers (1923)
- Danny Murtaugh (1937-1938) Manager: 1960 World Series Champion Pittsburgh Pirates
- Ken Raffensberger (1937) MLB All-Star
- George Selkirk (1927) 2 x MLB All-Star
- Max Surkont (1938)
- Don Zimmer (1949) 2 x MLB All-Star; 1989 NL Manager of the Year
