= Salisbury Indians =

The Salisbury Indians were a United States minor league baseball team which played in Salisbury, Maryland. The team began operation in 1922 as a founding member of the Eastern Shore League, which operated out of cities on the Delmarva Peninsula.

The Indians did not field a particularly competitive team in the first year of its existence, but from 1923 through 1927 they finished second or third every year. Because of economic hard times, however, the league ceased operations before the 1928 season.

== 1937 season ==
The Eastern Shore League was revived in 1936 with the original six teams and the addition of two more. Seven of the eight teams were affiliates of Major league teams. The Salisbury team was affiliated with the Washington Senators. Under the rules of play then in existence, teams in the Class D division of baseball, which included all of the teams in the Eastern Shore League, were only allowed to field three players who had ever played in a higher level league. In 1937, Eastern Shore League commissioner Colonel J. Thomas Kibler ruled that Salisbury was fielding four players with higher level experience because one of their players had signed with a Class C team, even though he had never played for them. Kibler ruled that Salisbury had to forfeit all of its games, meaning that, although they had a record of 21-5 at the time, they dropped to 0-26. The team appealed, first to William G. Bramham, president of the National Association, then to Kenesaw Mountain Landis, Commissioner of Baseball, but the ruling stood.

The team decided that they would recuperate by being competitive on the field. They did so by finishing the season with 59 wins and 11 losses, and winning the league pennant. Counting the wins they had forfeited, Salisbury had a record of 80-16 for the season. Prior to the beginning of the Eastern Shore League playoffs, Salisbury played the Trenton team, which was the Senators' Class A team. The Indians won, 72–. They then went on to win the league playoffs. The Indians' manager, Jake Flowers, was named Minor League Manager of the Year by The Sporting News. The 1937 Indians were recognized as one of the 100 greatest minor league teams of all time.

== Later years ==
In 1938, with many of the same players as the year before, Salisbury went 65-47 to repeat as champions.

The Indians and the league continued in operation until 1941, when the league closed for the duration of World War II, then reformed from 1946 through 1949. The Indians won the league two more times, and won the regular season pennant but lost in the playoffs one time. In 1951, a reconstituted Salisbury Indians team joined the Class B Interstate League, but that team only existed for two years.

Salisbury had no further minor league baseball participation until 1996, when the Delmarva Shorebirds joined the South Atlantic League.
