= List of high schools in Maryland =

This is a list of high schools in the state of Maryland.

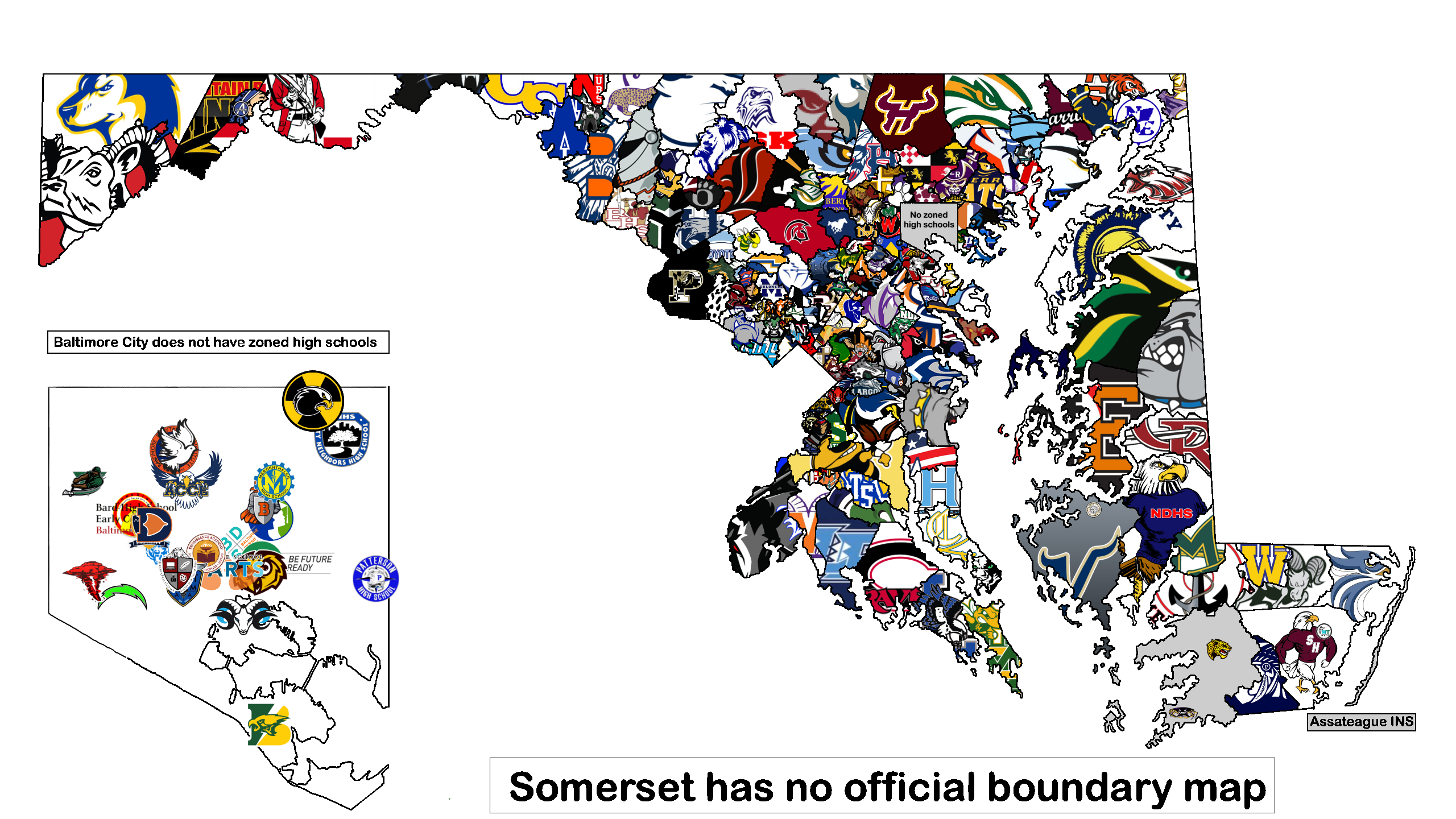
A map of the public high schools in Maryland signified by their logos. (2025-2026 school year boundaries)

== Allegany County ==
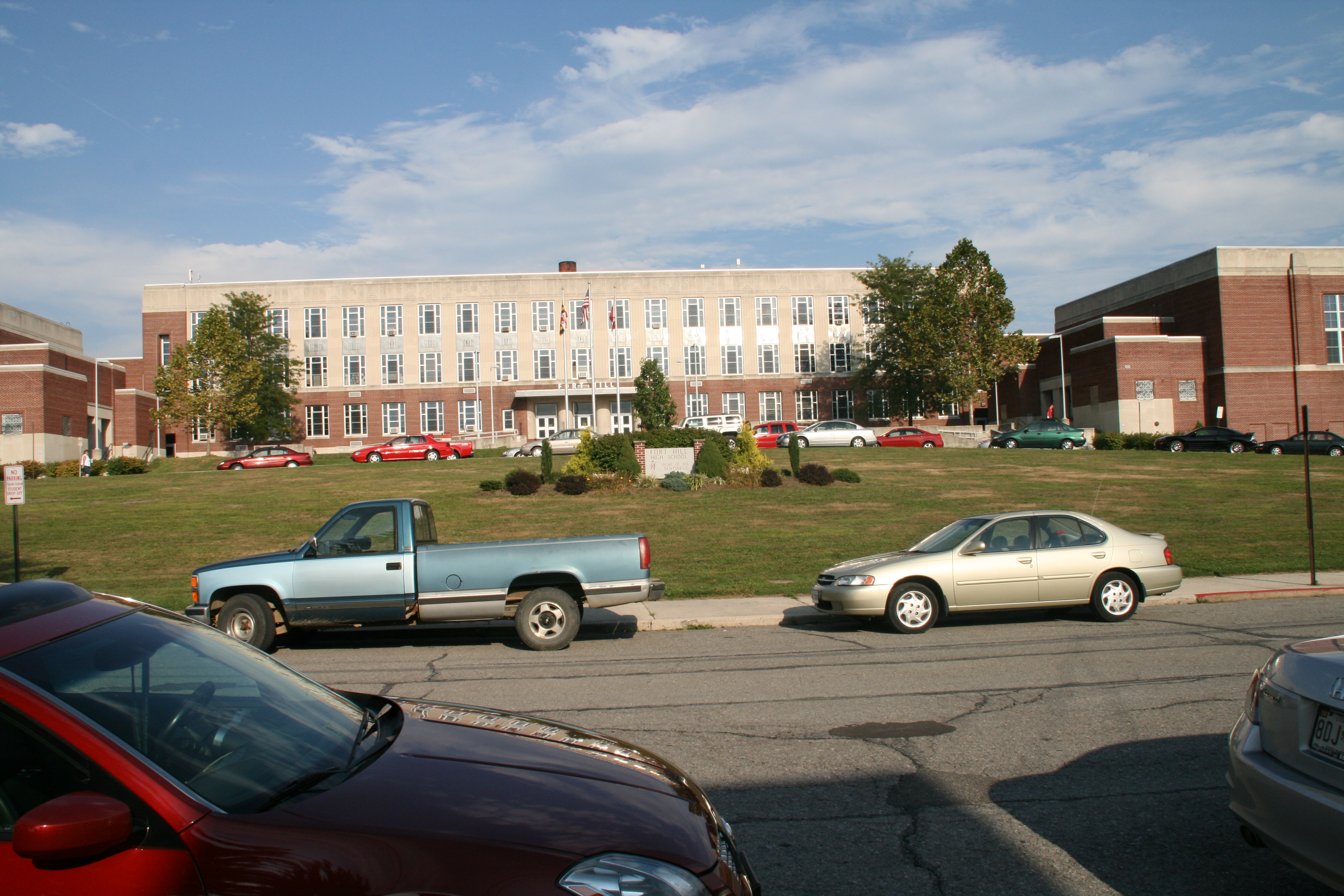
Fort Hill

=== Allegany County Public Schools ===
- Mountain Ridge High School, Frostburg
- Center for Career & Technical Education, Cresaptown

==== Cumberland ====
- Allegany High School
- Fort Hill High School

=== Allegany County non-public schools ===
- Bishop Walsh School, Cumberland
- Calvary Christian Academy, Cresaptown

== Anne Arundel County ==
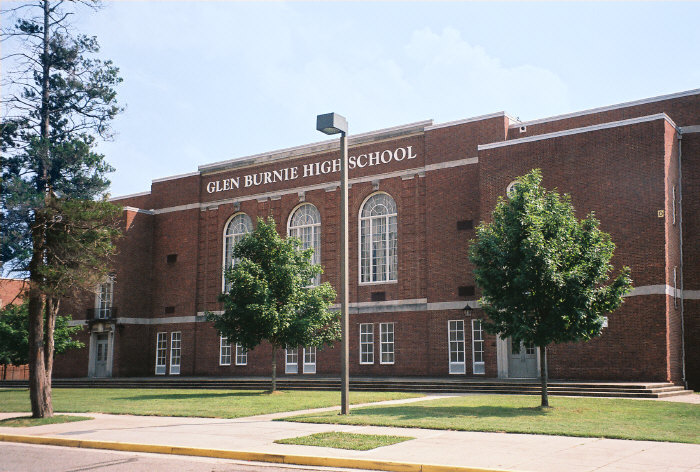
Glen Burnie

=== Anne Arundel County Public Schools ===
- Chesapeake Science Point Charter School, Hanover
- Mary E. Moss Academy, Crownsville
- Meade Senior High School, Fort Meade
- Old Mill High School, Millersville
- Severn Run High School, Severn
- Severna Park High School, Severna Park
- South River High School, Edgewater
- Southern High School, Harwood

==== Annapolis ====
- Annapolis High School
- Broadneck High School
- Phoenix Academy

==== Gambrills ====
- Arundel High School
- Crofton High School

==== Glen Burnie ====
- Glen Burnie High School
- North County High School

==== Pasadena ====
- Chesapeake High School
- Northeast Senior High School

=== Anne Arundel County non-public schools ===
- Arundel Christian School, Hanover
- Indian Creek School, Crownsville
- Odenton Christian School, Odenton
- Severn School, Severna Park

==== Annapolis ====
- The Key School
- St. Mary's High School

==== Glen Burnie ====
- Calvary Baptist Church Academy
- Granite Baptist School

==== Severn ====
- Annapolis Area Christian School
- Archbishop Spalding High School

== Baltimore City ==
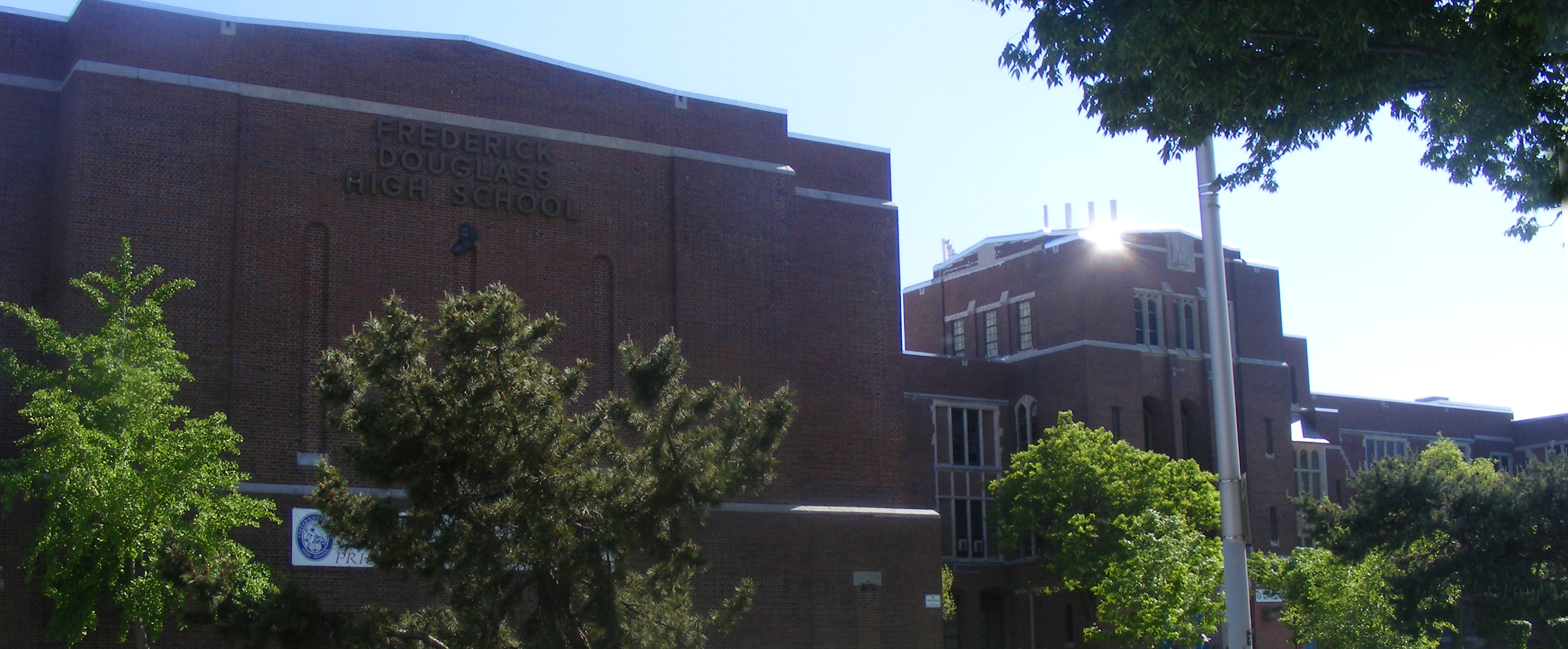
Frederick Douglass High School (formerly Western High School building (1927-1955)

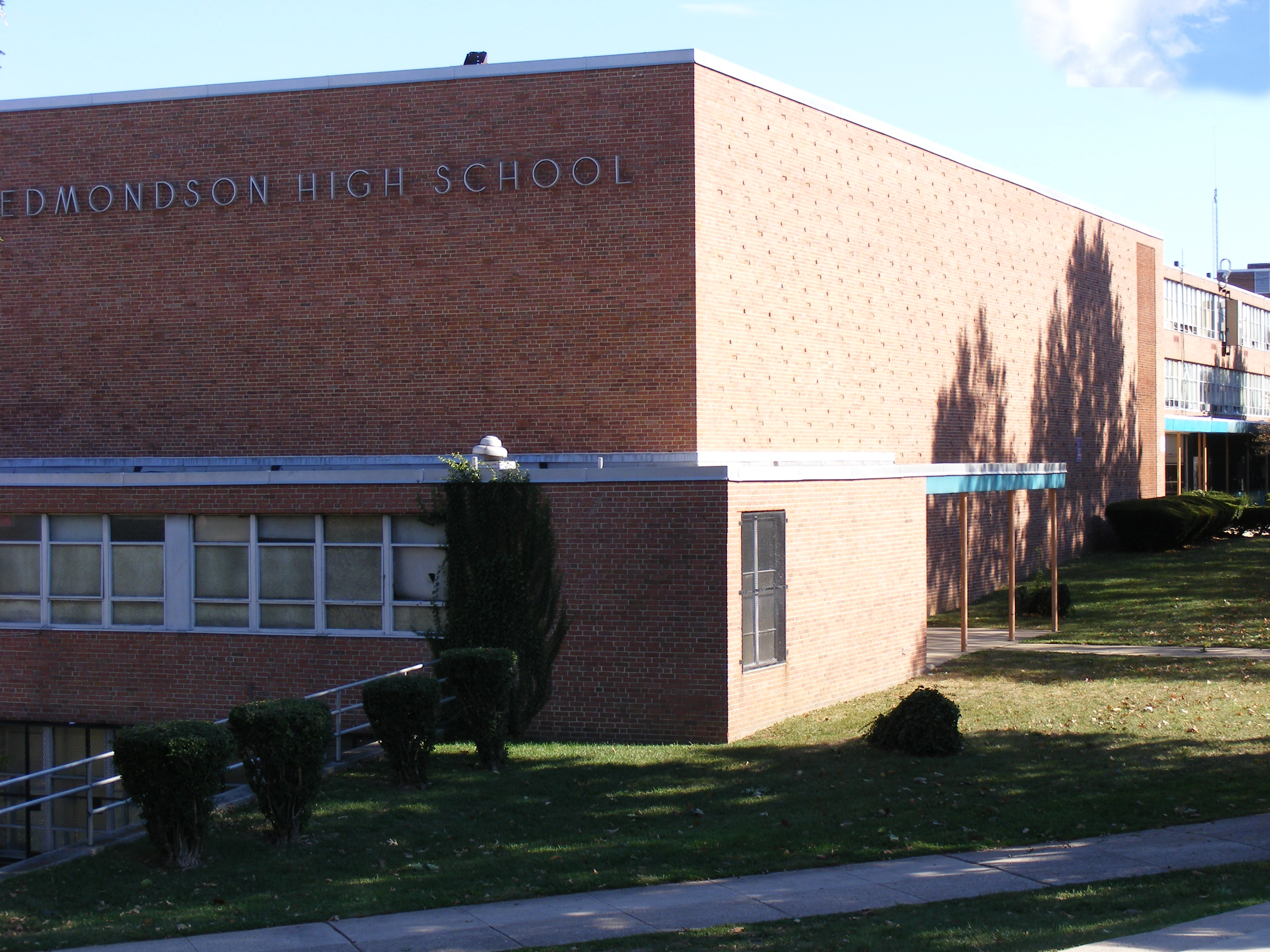
Edmondson / Westside High School

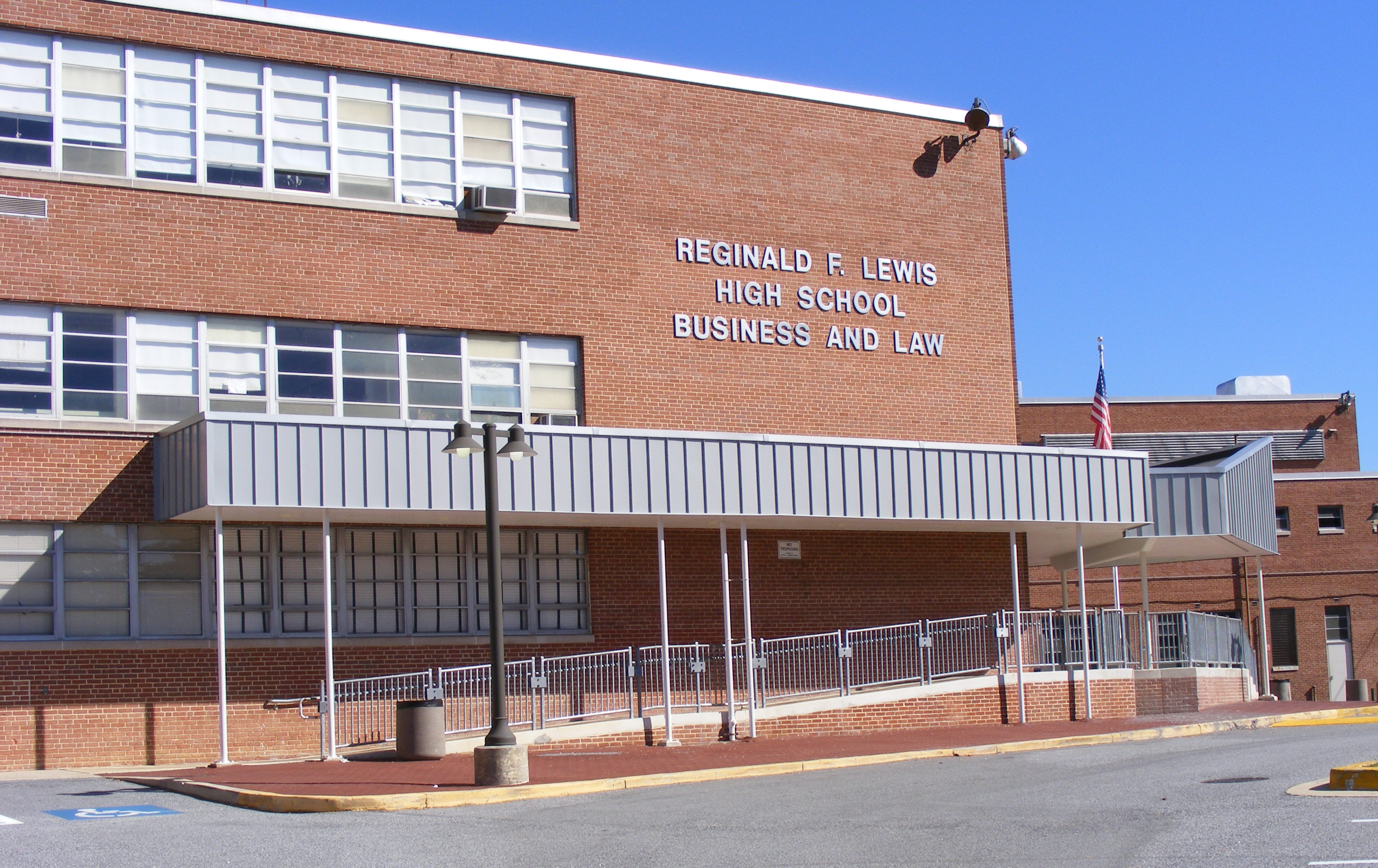
Reginald F. Lewis High School

Mergenthaler Vocational-Technical High School

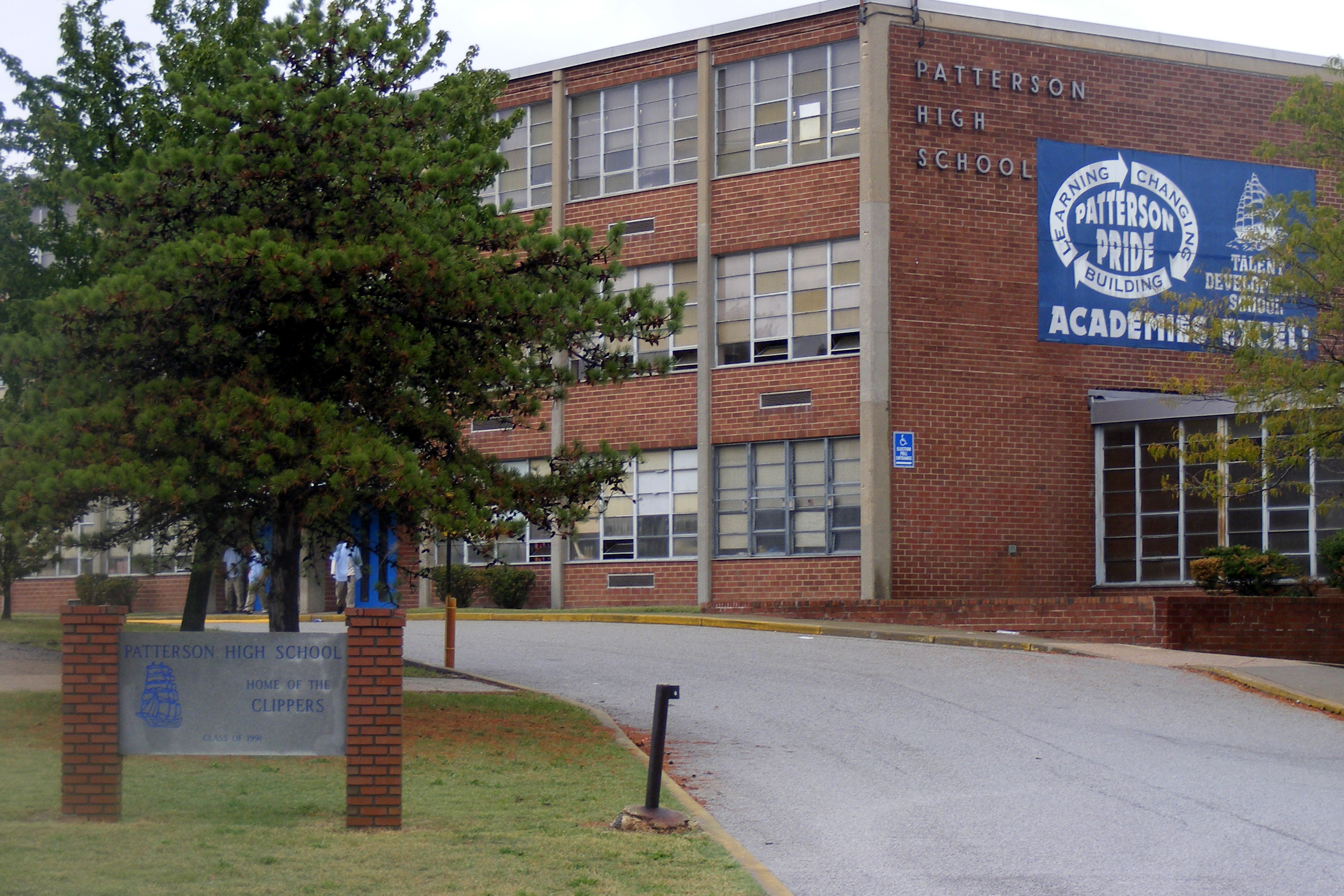
Patterson High School

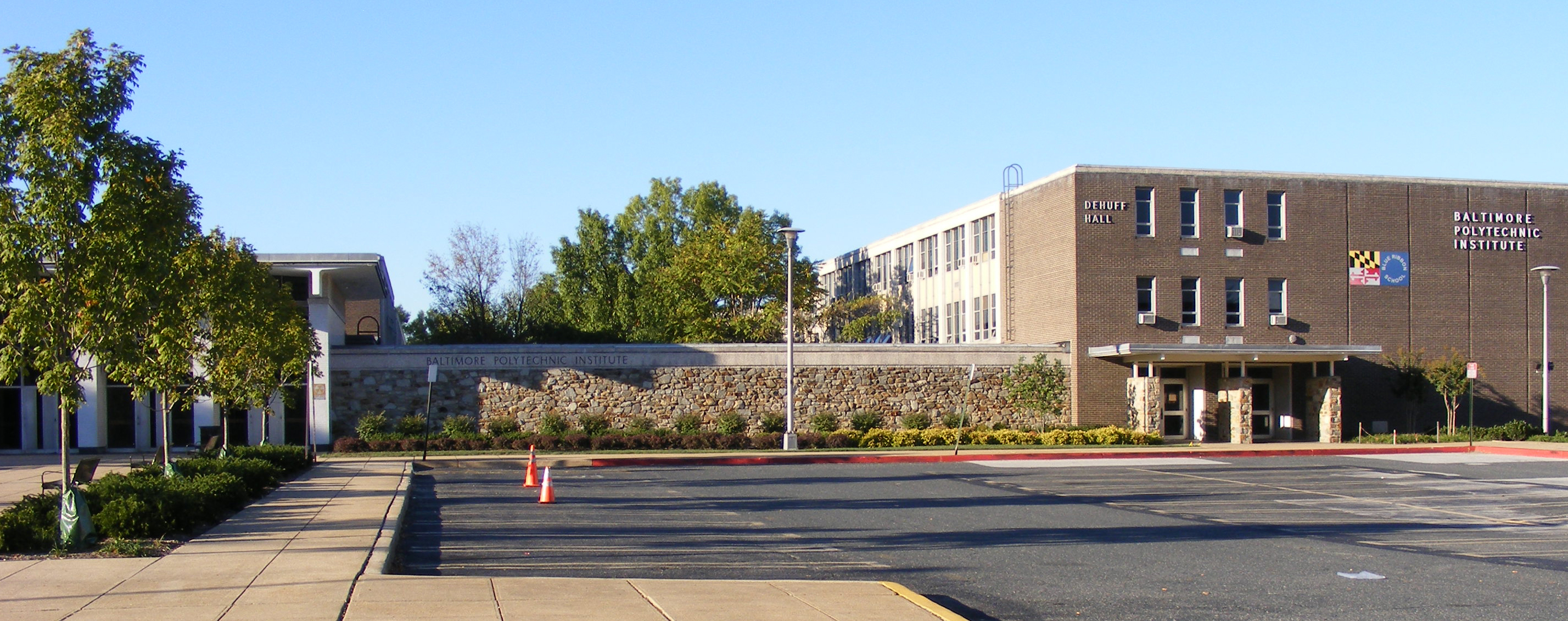
Baltimore Polytechnic institute

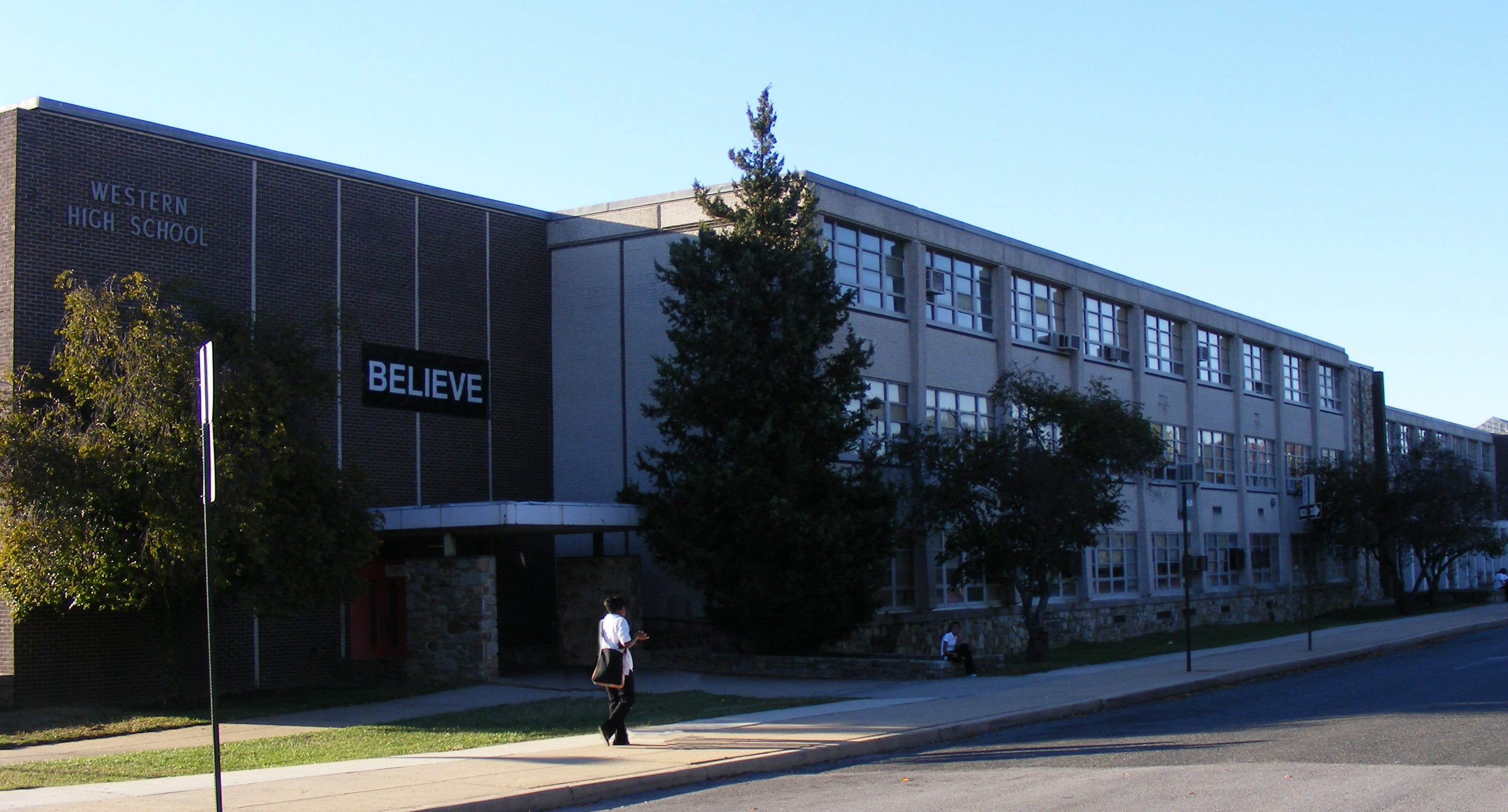
Western High School

=== Baltimore City Public Schools (Alternative) ===
- Achievement Academy at Harbor City High School
- Baltimore Career Academy
- Eager Street Academy
- Excel Academy at Francis M. Wood High School
- Success Academy
- Youth Opportunity Academy

=== Baltimore City Public Schools (Charter) ===
- Baltimore Design School
- Baltimore Leadership School for Young Women
- Bard High School Early College Baltimore
- City Neighbors High School
- ConneXions: A Community Based Arts School
- Coppin Academy High School
- Green Street Academy
- Independence School Local I High School
- The Reach! Partnership School

=== Baltimore City Public Schools (Choice Lottery) ===
- Academy for College and Career Exploration
- Augusta Fells Savage Institute of Visual Arts
- Benjamin Franklin High School at Masonville Cove
- Bluford Drew Jemison STEM Academy West
- Digital Harbor High School
- Forest Park High School
- Frederick Douglass High School
- Mergenthaler Vocational-Technical High School
- National Academy Foundation High School
- New Era Academy
- Patterson High School
- Paul Laurence Dunbar High School
- Reginald F. Lewis High School
- Renaissance Academy
- Vivien T. Thomas Medical Arts Academy

=== Baltimore City Public Schools (Specialized) ===
- Baltimore City College
- Baltimore Polytechnic Institute
- Baltimore School for the Arts
- Carver Vocational Technical High School
- Edmondson-Westside High School
- Western High School

=== Baltimore City non-public schools ===
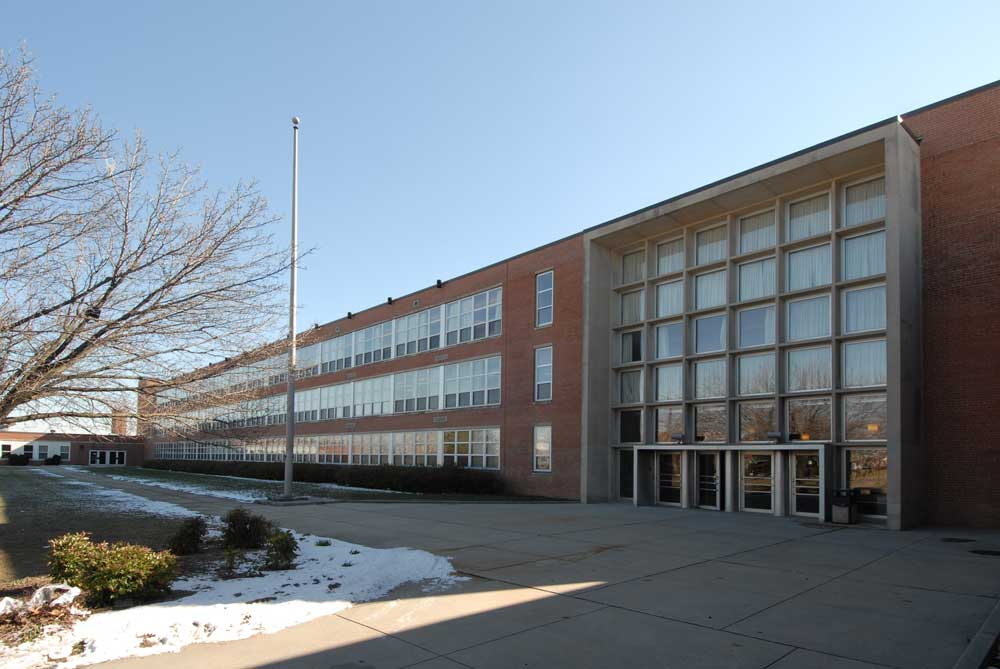
Archbishop Curley High School

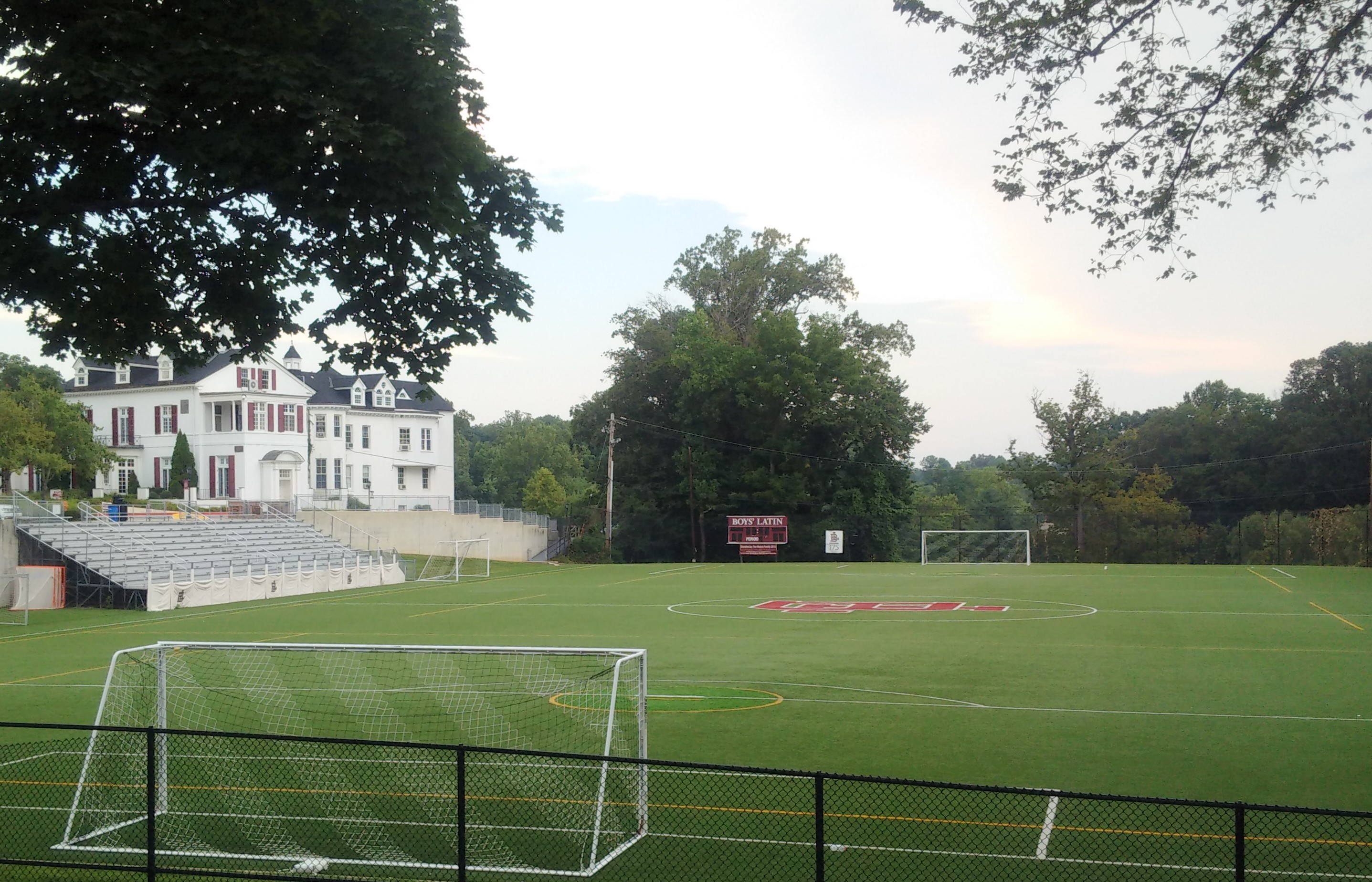
Boys' Latin School of Maryland

==== Catholic Schools ====
- Archbishop Curley High School
- The Catholic High School of Baltimore
- Cristo Rey Jesuit High School
- Mercy High School
- Mount Saint Joseph High School
- St. Frances Academy

==== Non-sectarian Independent Schools ====
- Boys' Latin School of Maryland
- Bryn Mawr School
- The Community School
- Gilman School
- Lab School of Baltimore
- Maryland School for the Blind
- Park School of Baltimore
- Roland Park Country School

==== Other Religious Schools ====
- Friends School of Baltimore (Quaker)
- Greater Grace Christian Academy (non-denominational Christian)

== Baltimore County ==
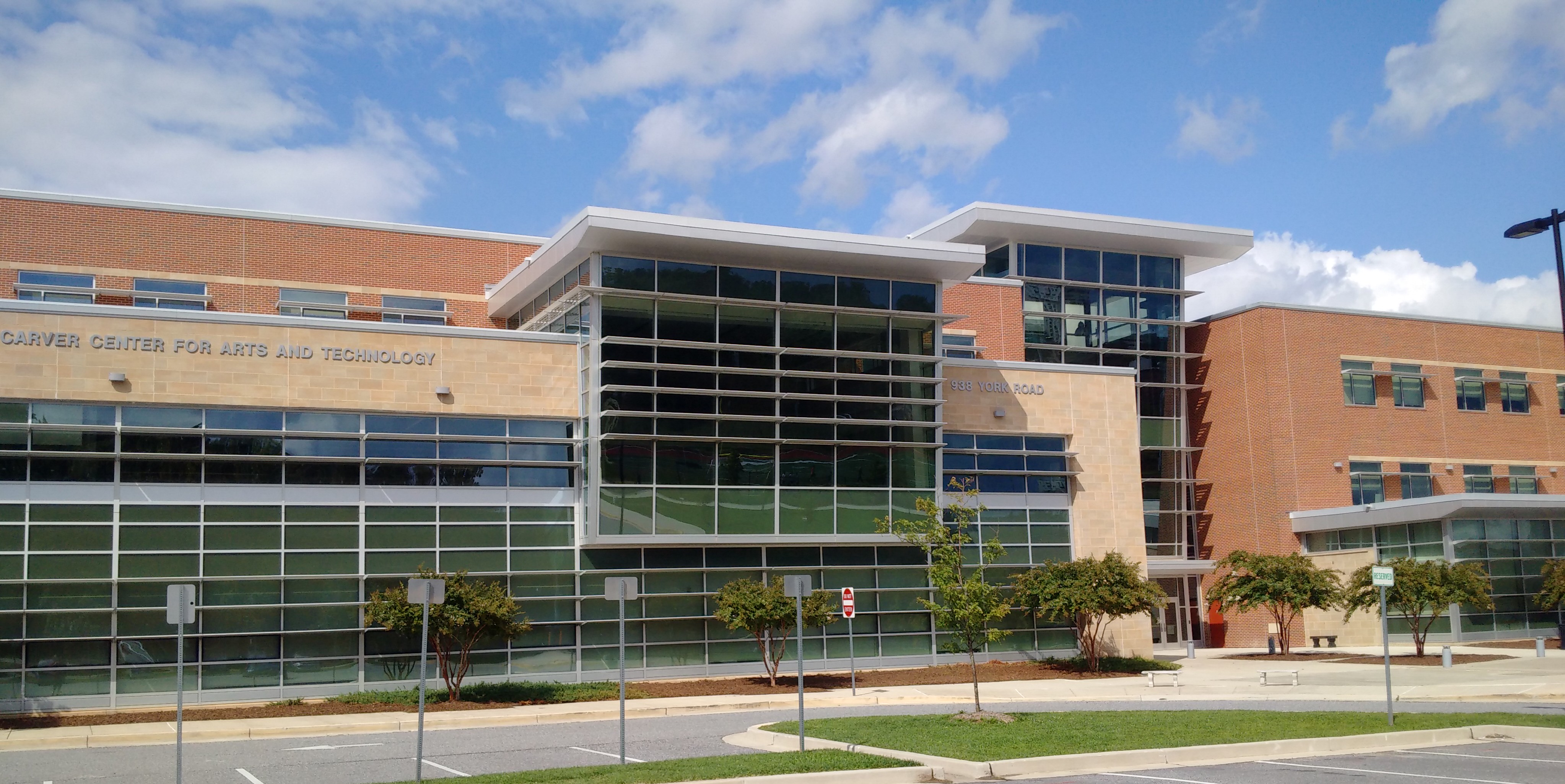
Carver

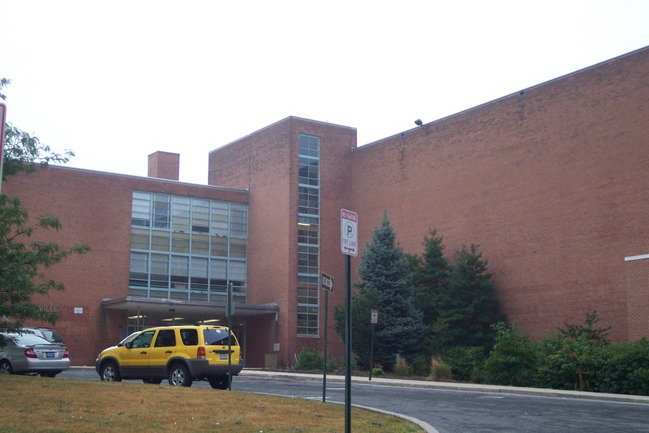
Catonsville

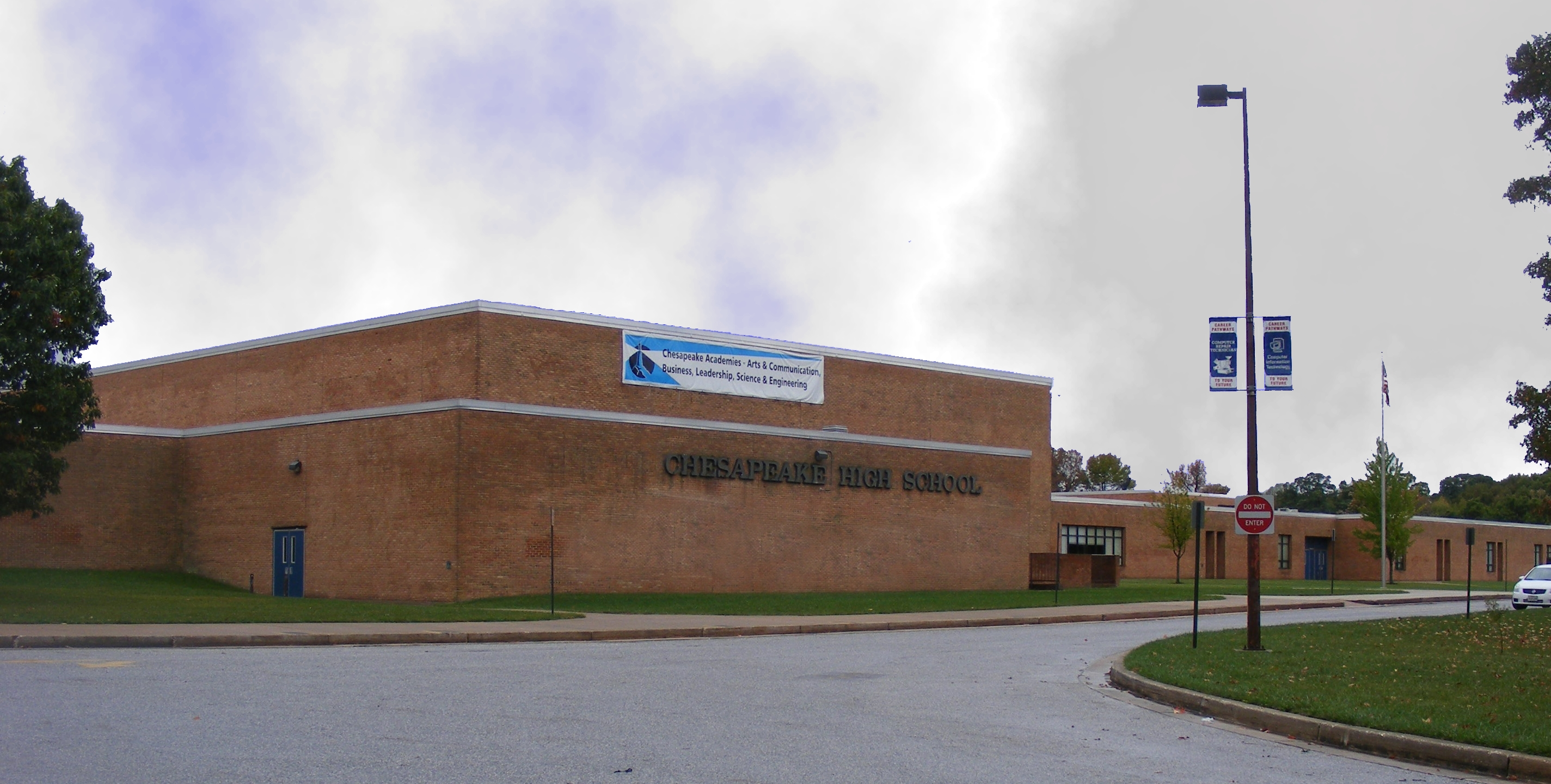
Chesapeake

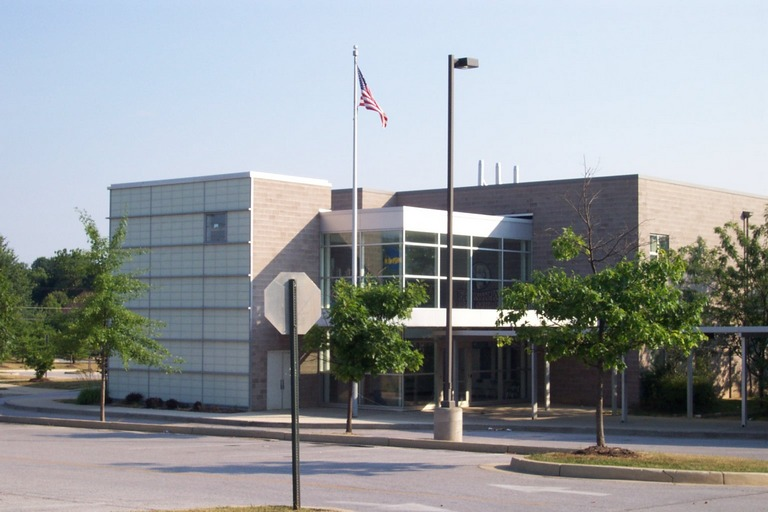
Franklin

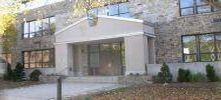
Hereford

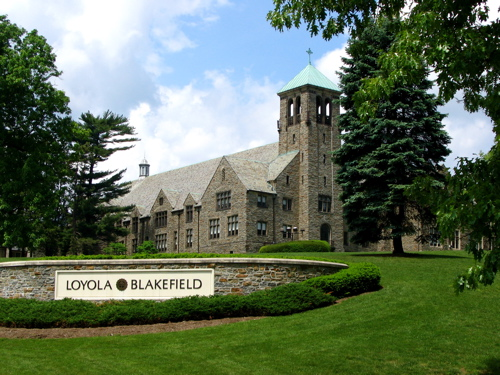
Loyola

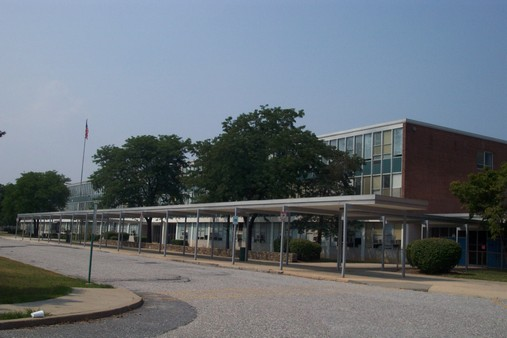
Parkville

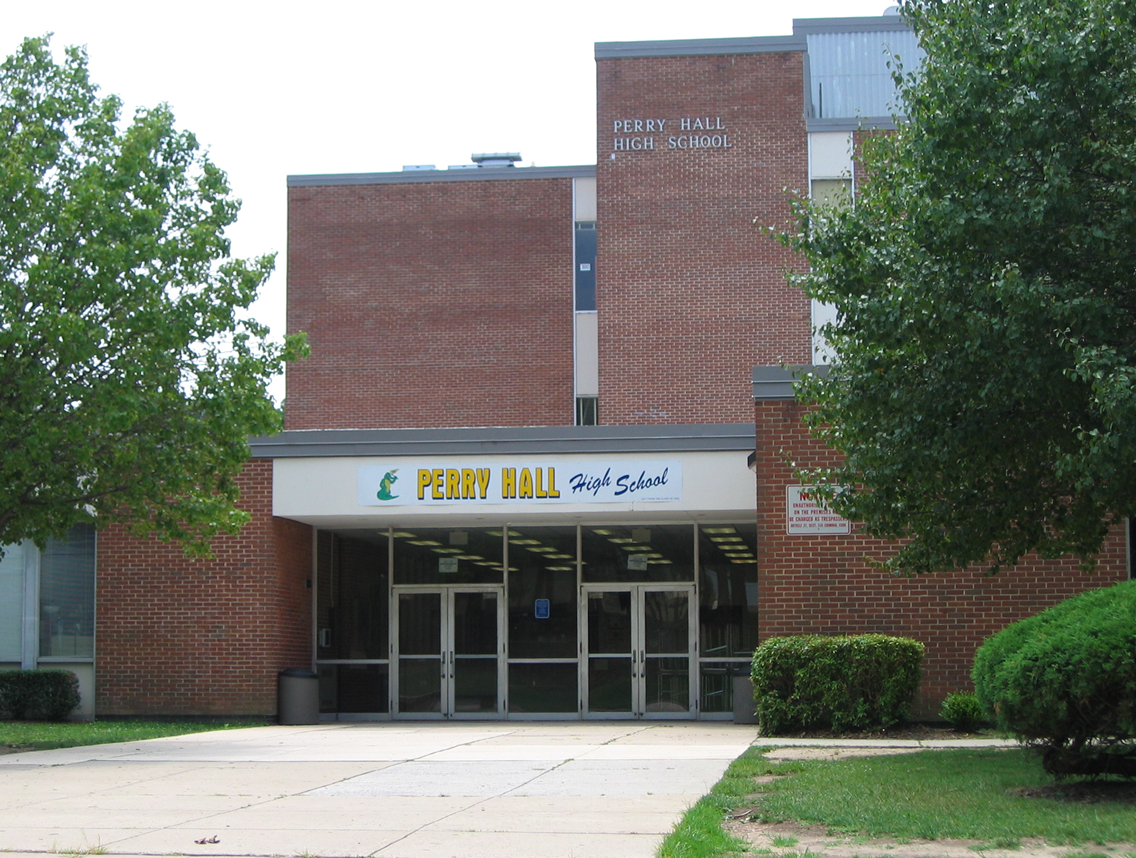
Perry Hall

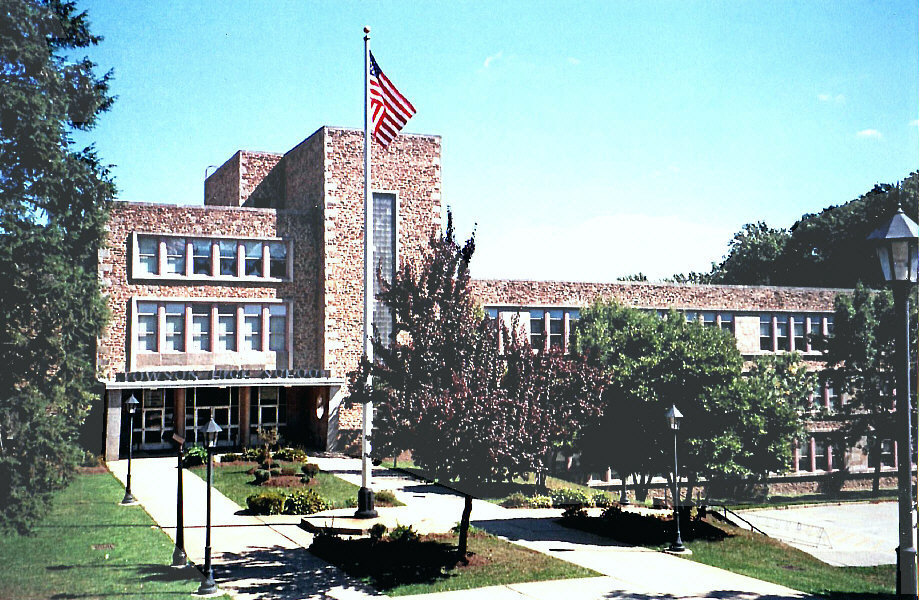
Towson

=== Baltimore County Public Schools ===
- Catonsville High School, Catonsville
- Dulaney High School, Timonium
- Dundalk High School, Dundalk
- Franklin High School, Reisterstown
- Hereford High School, Parkton
- Loch Raven High School, Towson
- Owings Mills High School, Owings Mills
- Perry Hall High School, Perry Hall
- Pikesville High School, Pikesville

==== Magnet Schools ====
- George Washington Carver Center for Arts and Technology, Towson
- Chesapeake High School, Essex
- Eastern Technical High School, Essex
- Kenwood High School, Essex
- Lansdowne High School, Lansdowne
- Milford Mill Academy, Milford Mill
- New Town High School, Owings Mills
- Overlea High School, Overlea
- Parkville High School, Parkville
- Patapsco High School, Dundalk
- Randallstown High School, Randallstown
- Sollers Point Technical High School, Dundalk
- Sparrows Point High School, Sparrows Point
- Towson High School, Towson
- Western School of Technology and Environmental Science, Catonsville
- Woodlawn High School, Woodlawn

=== Baltimore County non-public schools ===
- Al-Rahmah School, Catonsville (Islamic)

==== Non-sectarian/Independent schools ====
- Garrison Forest School, Owings Mills
- Jemicy School, Owings Mills
- McDonogh School, Owings Mills
- Mt. Zion Preparatory Academy, Lanham
- Oldfields School, Glencoe
- The Park School, Brooklandville

==== Catholic Schools ====
- Loyola Blakefield, Towson
- Calvert Hall College High School, Towson
- Maryvale Preparatory School, Brooklandville
- Mount de Sales Academy, Catonsville
- Notre Dame Preparatory School, Towson
- Our Lady of Mount Carmel School, Essex

==== Christian schools ====
- Arlington Baptist High School, Baltimore (Baptist)
- Concordia Preparatory School, Towson (Lutheran)
- Perry Hall Christian School, Perry Hall (non-denominational)
- St. Paul's School, Brooklandville (Episcopal)
- St. Paul's School for Girls, Brooklandville (Episcopal)
- St. Timothy's School, Stevenson (Episcopal)

==== Jewish Schools ====
- Bais Yaakov of Baltimore, Baltimore/Owings Mills
- Beth Tfiloh Dahan Community School, Pikesville
- Israel Henry Beren High School, Pikesville
- Talmudical Academy of Baltimore, Pikesville

== Calvert County ==
=== Calvert County Public Schools ===
- Calvert High School, Prince Frederick
- Huntingtown High School, Huntingtown
- Northern High School, Owings
- Patuxent High School, Lusby

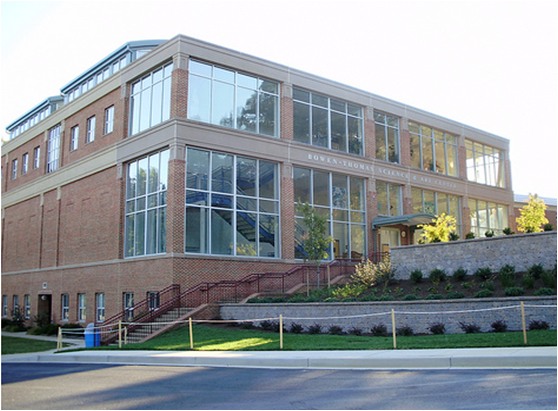
Calverton

=== Calvert County non-public school ===
- The Calverton School, Huntingtown

== Caroline County ==
- Colonel Richardson High School, Federalsburg

=== Ridgely ===
- Career & Technology Center
- North Caroline High School

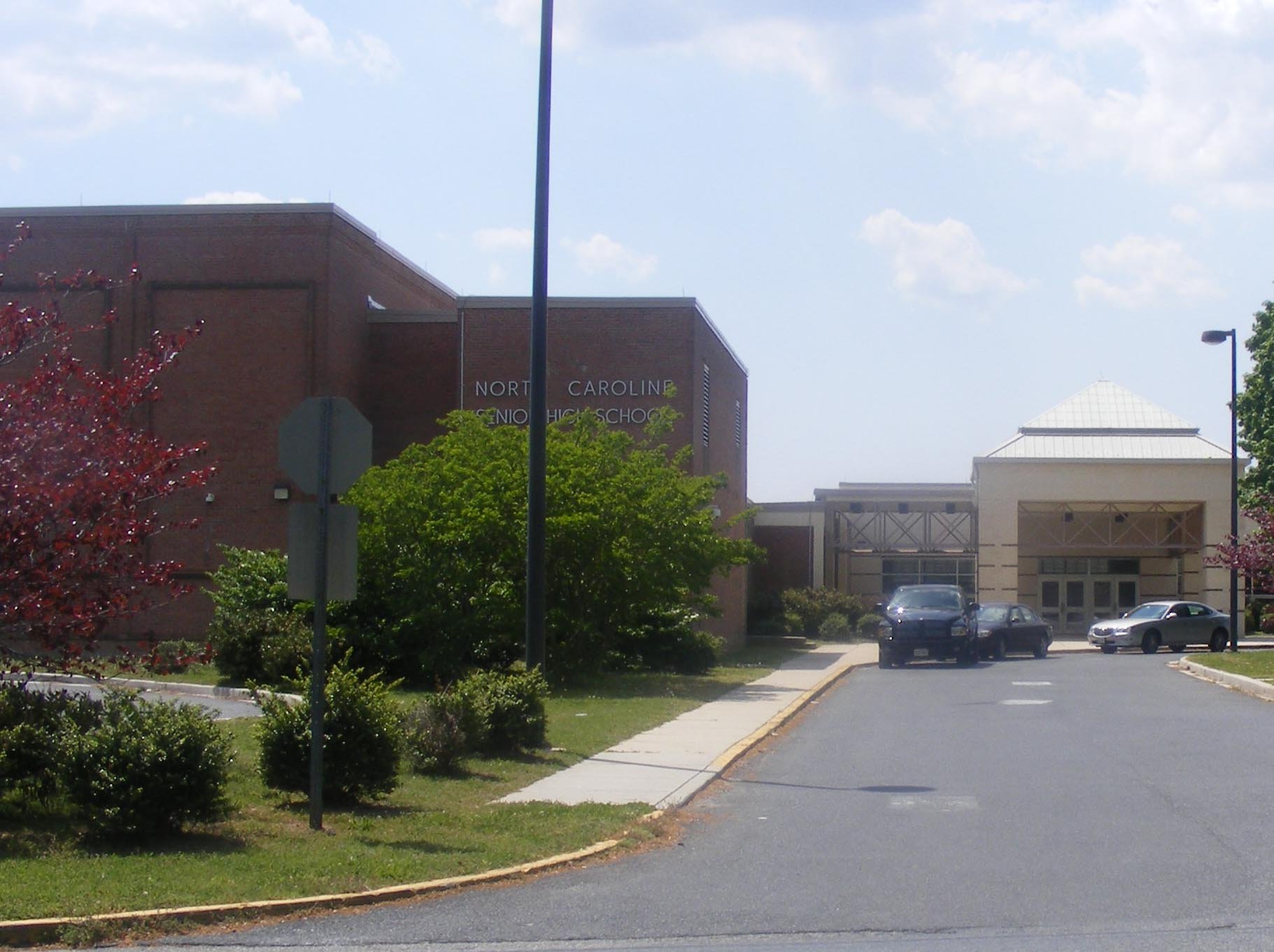
North Caroline

== Carroll County ==
Liberty

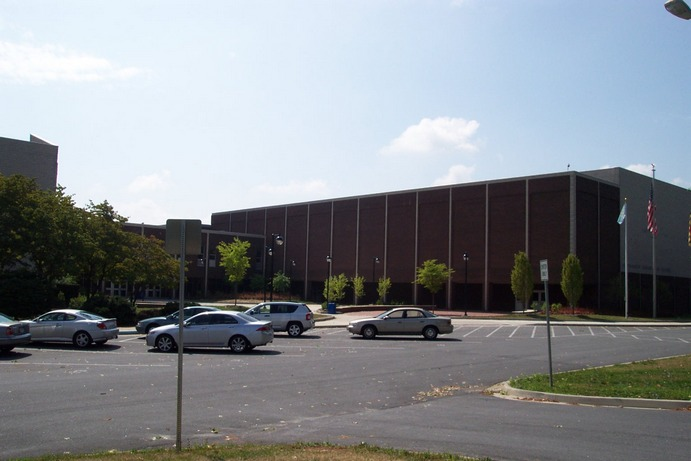
Westminster

=== Carroll County Public Schools ===
- Francis Scott Key High School, Union Bridge
- Liberty High School, Eldersburg
- Manchester Valley High School, Manchester

==== Sykesville ====
- Century High School
- South Carroll High School

==== Westminster ====
- Carroll County Career and Technology Center
- Westminster Senior High School
- Winters Mill High School

=== Carroll County non-public schools ===
- Carroll Christian Schools, Westminster
- Gerstell Academy, Finksburg
- Silver Oak Academy, Keymar

== Cecil County ==
=== Cecil County Public Schools ===
- Bohemia Manor High School, Chesapeake City
- Perryville High School, Perryville

==== Elkton ====
- Cecil County School of Technology
- Elkton High School

==== North East ====
- North East High School
- Rising Sun High School

=== Cecil County Private Schools ===
- Tri-State Christian Academy, Elkton
- Tome School, North East
- West Nottingham Academy, Colora

== Charles County ==
=== Charles County Public Schools ===
- Henry E. Lackey High School, Indian Head
- La Plata High School, La Plata
- Maurice J. McDonough High School, Pomfret

==== Waldorf ====
- North Point High School
- St. Charles High School
- Thomas Stone High School
- Westlake High School

=== Charles County non-public schools ===
- Grace Christian Academy, Waldorf
- Southern Maryland Christian Academy, White Plains

== Dorchester County ==
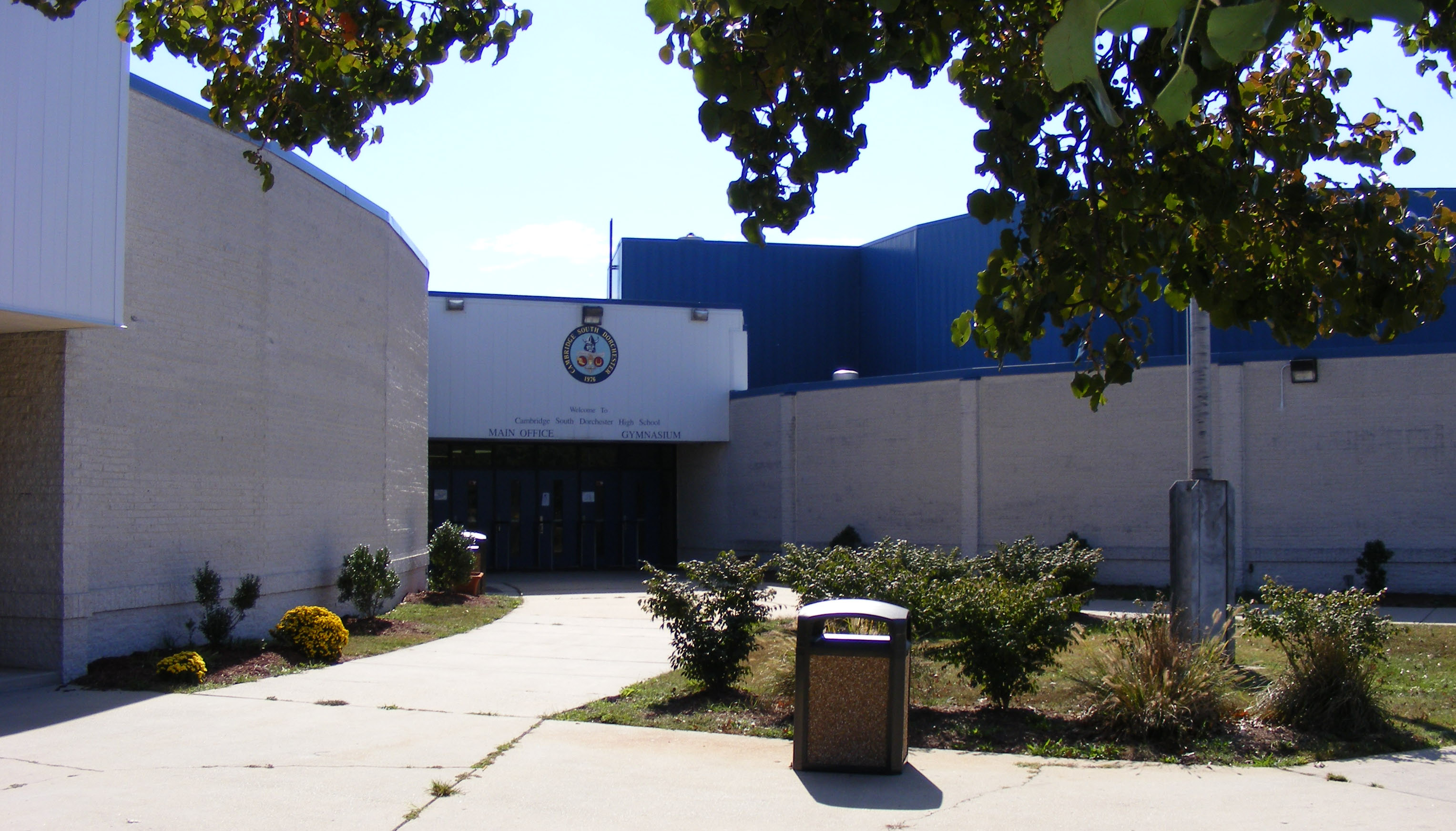
Cambridge-South Dorchester

=== Dorchester County Public Schools ===
- North Dorchester High School, Hurlock

==== Cambridge ====
- Cambridge-South Dorchester High School
- Dorchester County School of Technology

== Frederick County ==
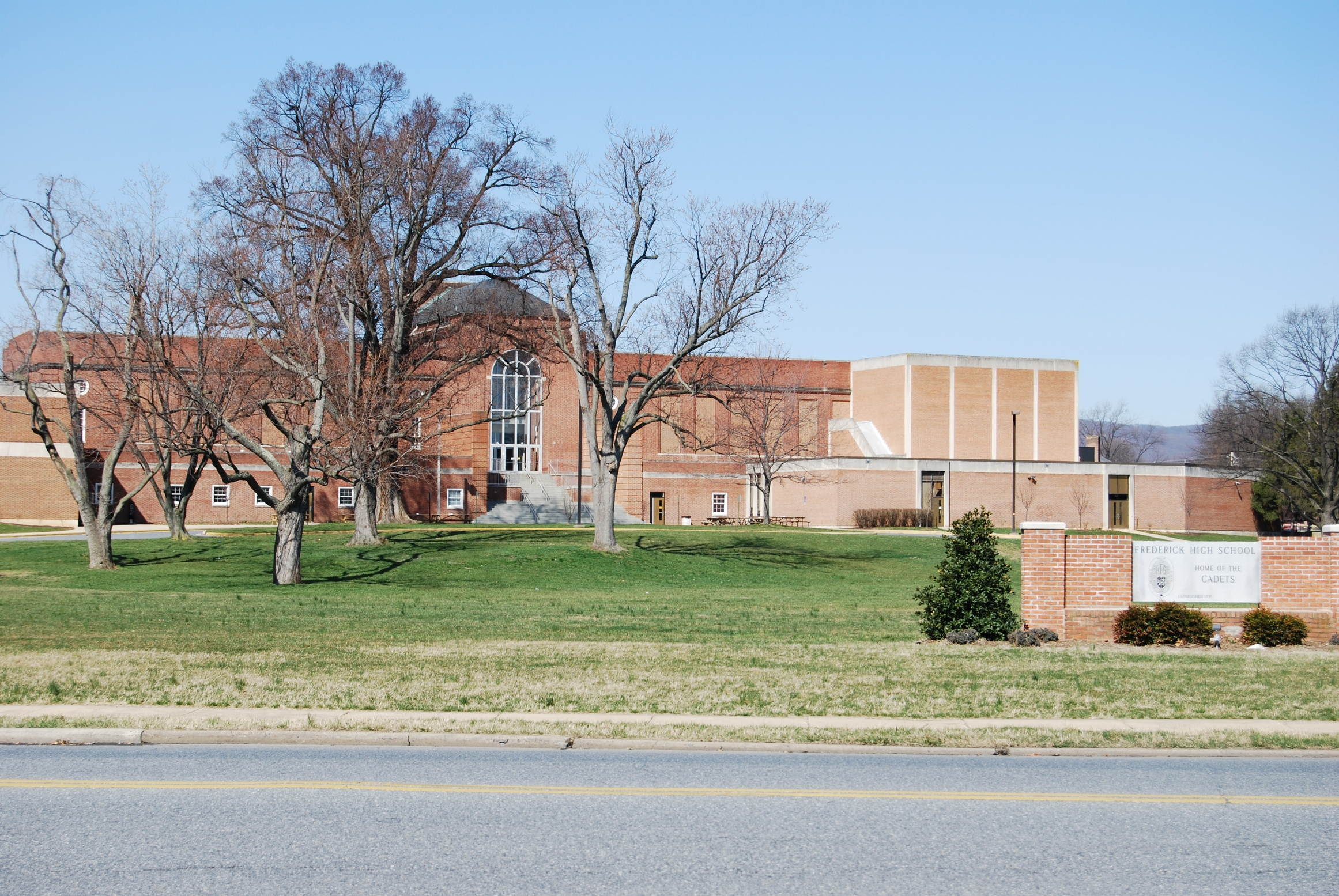
Frederick High

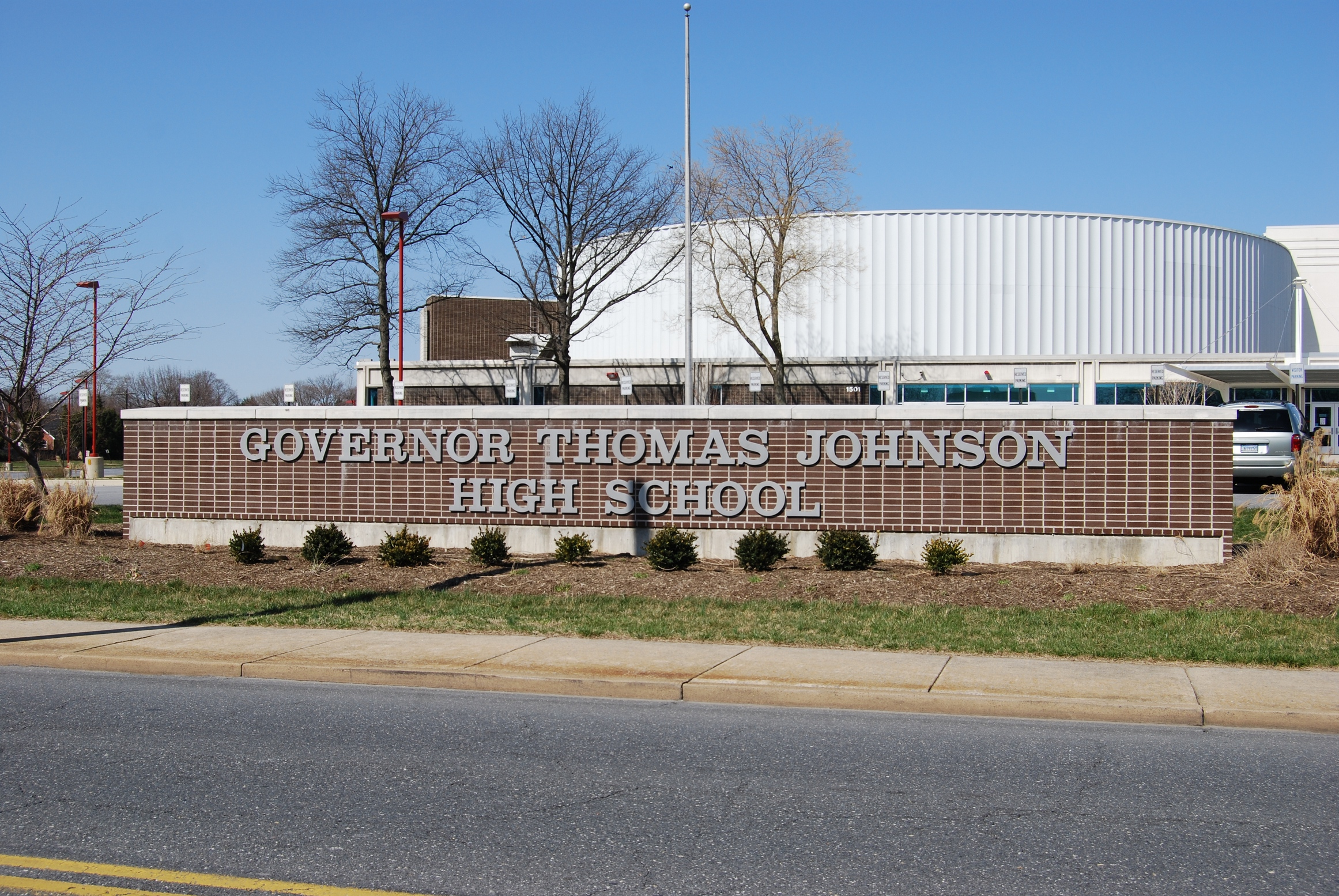
Thomas Johnson High

=== Frederick County Public Schools ===
- Brunswick High School, Brunswick
- Catoctin High School, Thurmont
- Middletown High School, Middletown
- Oakdale High School, New Market
- Urbana High School, Ijamsville
- Walkersville High School, Walkersville

==== Frederick ====
- Frederick High School
- Governor Thomas Johnson High School
- Linganore High School
- Tuscarora High School

=== Frederick County non-public schools ===
- Friends Meeting School, Ijamsville
- St. John's Catholic Prep, Buckeystown

==== Frederick ====
- Frederick Christian Academy
- Maryland School for the Deaf
- New Life Christian School

== Garrett County ==
- Northern Garrett High School, Accident
- Southern Garrett High School, Oakland

== Harford County ==
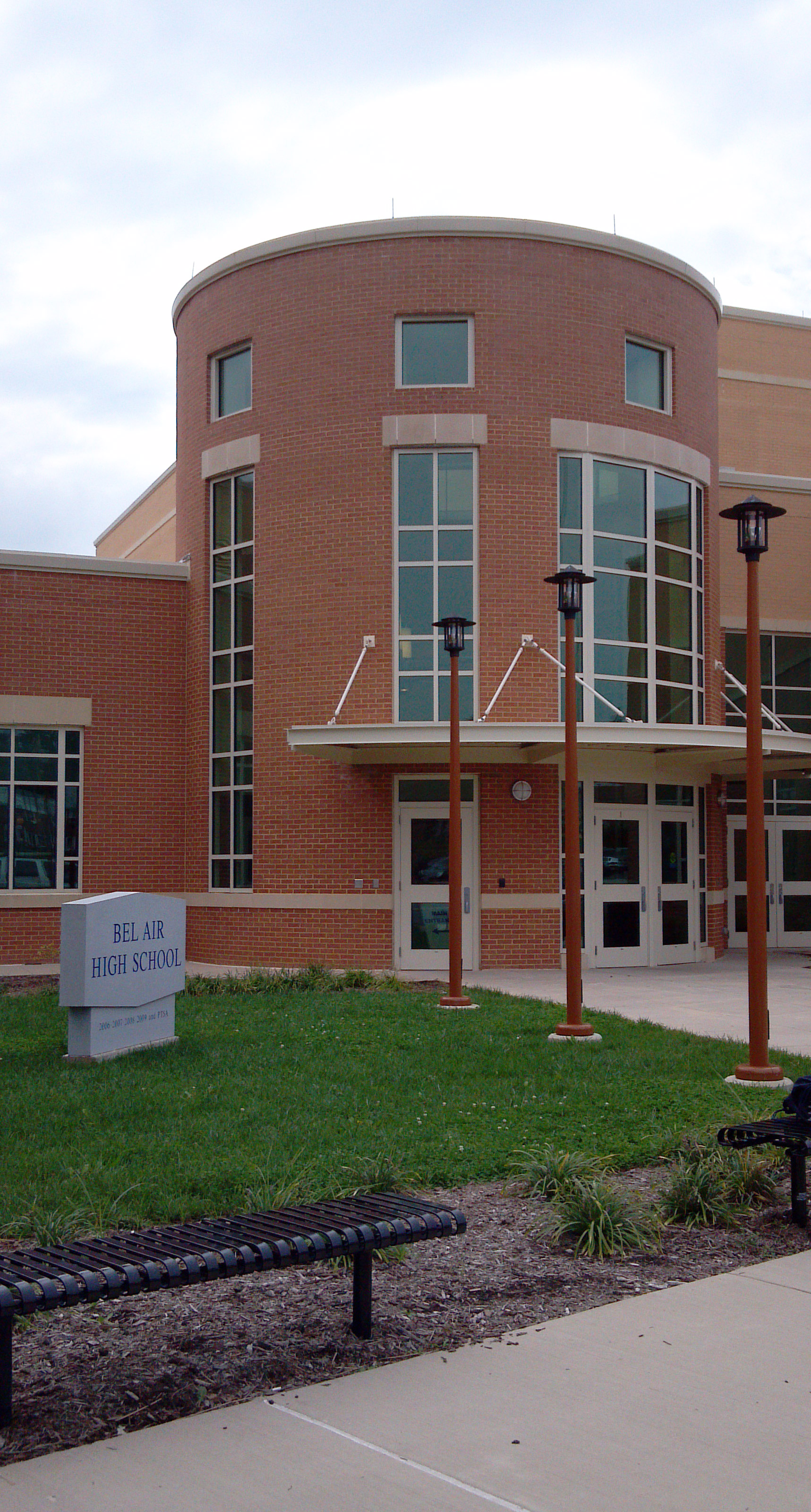
Bel Air High

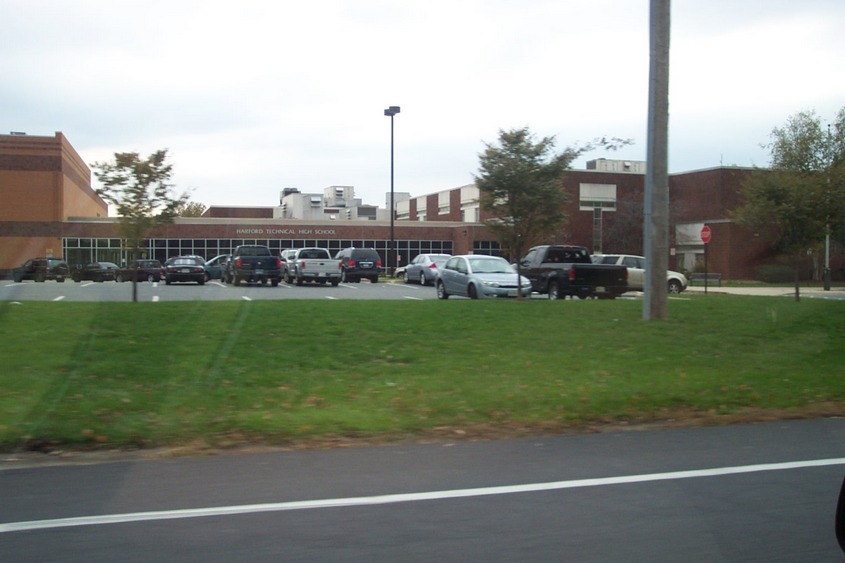
Harford Tech

=== Harford County Public Schools ===
- Aberdeen High School, Aberdeen
- Edgewood High School, Edgewood
- Fallston High School, Fallston
- Havre De Grace High School, Havre De Grace
- Joppatowne High School, Joppatowne
- North Harford High School, Pylesville

==== Bel Air ====
- Bel Air High School
- C. Milton Wright High School
- Harford Technical High School
- Patterson Mill High School

=== Harford County non-public schools ===
- Bethel Christian Academy, Havre De Grace
- Harford Christian School, Darlington
- The Highlands School, Bel Air
- The John Carroll School, Bel Air
- New Covenant Christian School, Abingdon

== Howard County ==
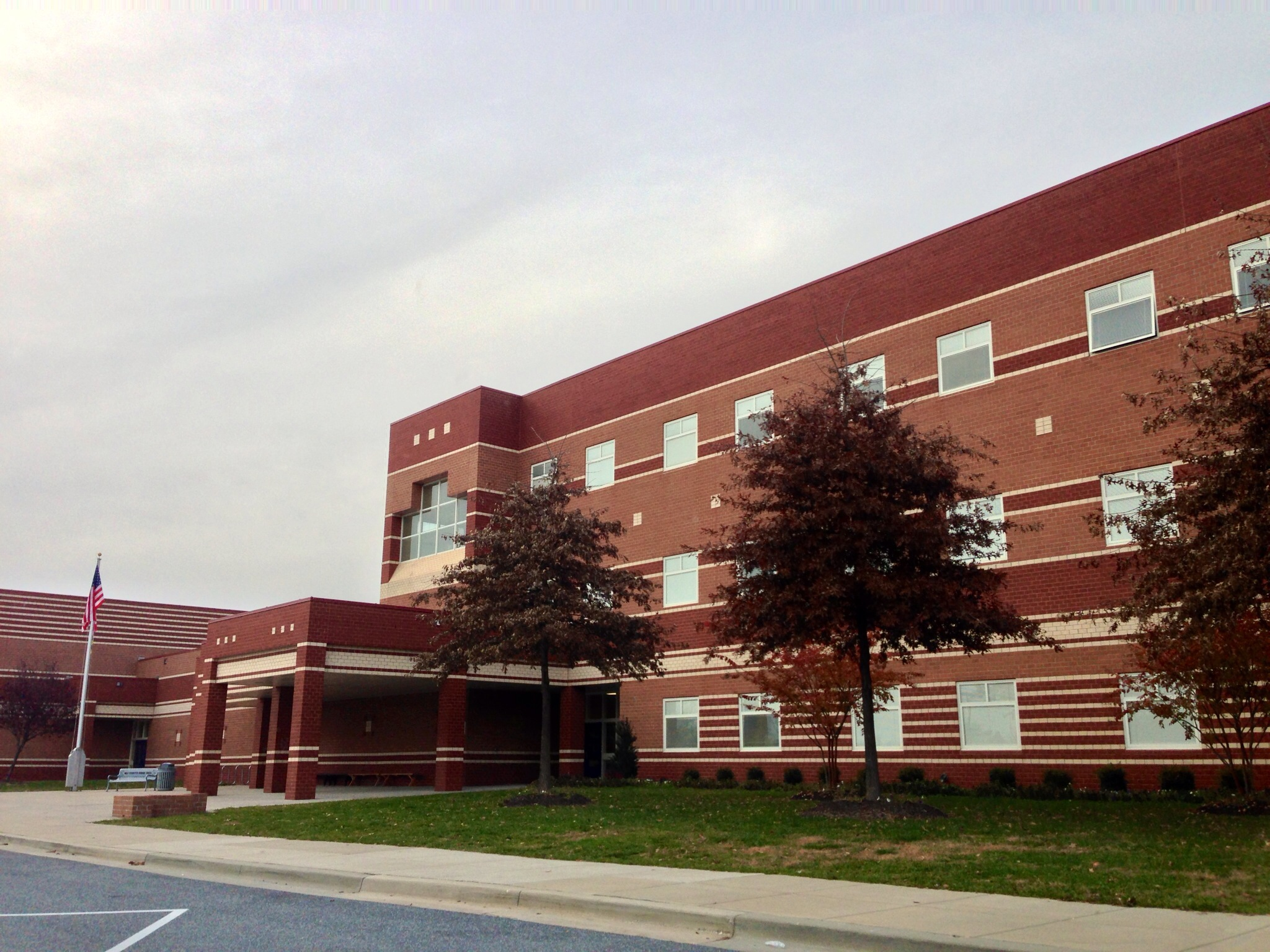
Marriotts Ridge

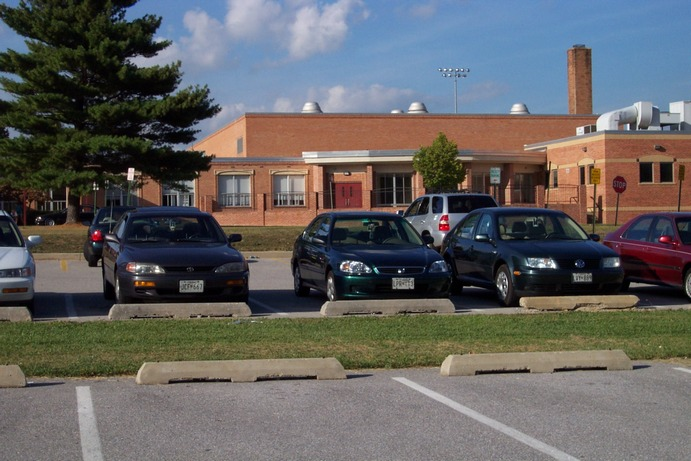
Mount Hebron

=== Howard County Public Schools ===
- Atholton High School, Columbia
- Centennial High School, Ellicott City
- Glenelg High School, Glenelg
- Guilford Park High School, Jessup
- Hammond High School, Columbia
- Howard High School, Columbia
- Long Reach High School, Columbia
- Marriotts Ridge High School, Marriottsville
- Mount Hebron High School, Ellicott City
- Oakland Mills High School, Columbia
- Reservoir High School, Fulton
- River Hill High School, Clarksville
- Wilde Lake High School, Columbia

=== Howard County non-public schools ===
- Atholton Adventist Academy, Columbia
- Chapelgate Christian Academy, Marriottsville
- Glenelg Country School, Glenelg

== Kent County ==
- Kent County High School, Worton

== Montgomery County ==
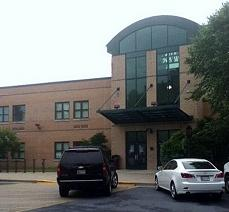
Einstein

Rockville High

=== Montgomery County Public Schools ===
- Albert Einstein High School, North Kensington
- Bethesda-Chevy Chase High School, Bethesda
- Clarksburg High School, Clarksburg
- Col. Zadok Magruder High School
- Damascus High School, Damascus
- Gaithersburg High School, Gaithersburg
- James Hubert Blake High School, Cloverly
- John F. Kennedy High School, Glenmont
- Montgomery Blair High School, Four Corners
- Northwest High School, Germantown
- Northwood High School, Silver Spring
- Paint Branch High School, Burtonsville
- Poolesville High School, Poolesville
- Quince Orchard High School, Gaithersburg
- Richard Montgomery High School, Rockville
- Rockville High School, Rockville
- Seneca Valley High School, Germantown
- Sherwood High School, Sandy Spring
- Springbrook High School, Silver Spring
- Thomas S. Wootton High School, Rockville
- Walt Whitman High School, Bethesda
- Walter Johnson High School, Bethesda
- Watkins Mill High School, Gaithersburg
- Wheaton High School, Silver Spring
- Winston Churchill High School, Potomac

==== Part-time technical schools ====
- Thomas Edison High School of Technology, Silver Spring

=== Montgomery County non-public schools ===
Georgetown Prep

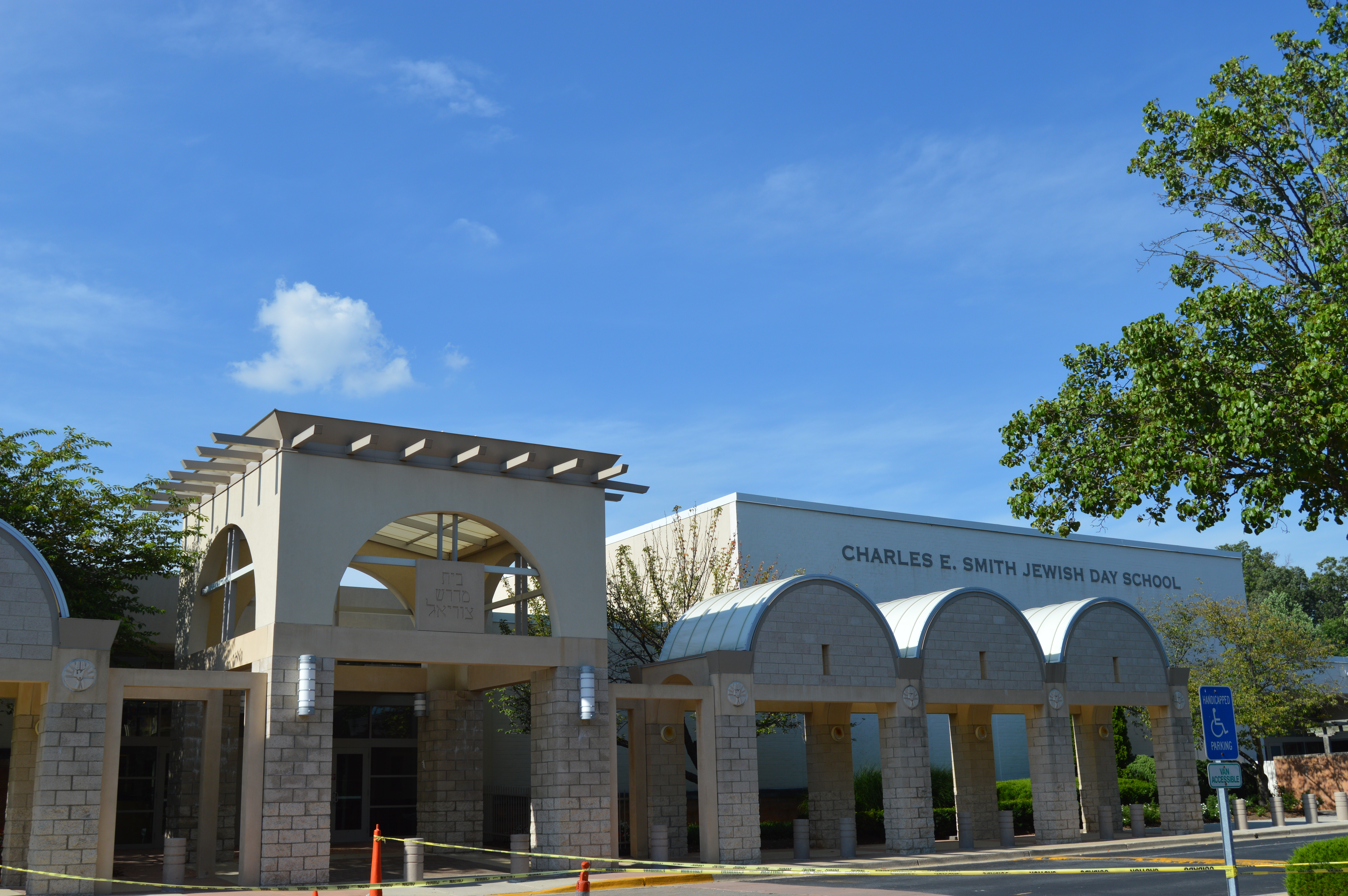
Jewish Day School

==== Non-denominational Independent Schools ====
- The Barrie School, Silver Spring
- The Bullis School, Potomac
- German International School Washington D.C., Potomac
- The Heights School, Potomac
- Holton-Arms School, Bethesda
- Landon School, Bethesda
- McLean School of Maryland, Potomac
- Nora School, Silver Spring
- Rochambeau French International School, Bethesda
- Sandy Spring Friends School, Sandy Spring
- The Siena School, Silver Spring
- Thornton Friends School, Silver Spring
- Washington Waldorf School, Bethesda

==== Catholic Schools ====
- Academy of the Holy Cross, Kensington
- The Avalon School, Wheaton
- Brookewood School, Kensington
- Connelly School of the Holy Child, Potomac
- Don Bosco Cristo Rey High School, Takoma Park
- Georgetown Preparatory School, Rockville
- Our Lady of Good Counsel High School, Olney
- Stone Ridge School of the Sacred Heart, Bethesda

==== Other Religious Schools ====
- Charles E. Smith Jewish Day School, Rockville
- Covenant Life School, Gaithersburg
- Melvin J. Berman Hebrew Academy, Rockville
- The Muslim Community School, Potomac
- St. Andrew's Episcopal School, Potomac
- Spencerville Adventist Academy, Silver Spring
- Takoma Academy, Takoma Park
- Washington Christian Academy, Silver Spring
- Yeshiva of Greater Washington, Silver Spring

== Prince George's County ==
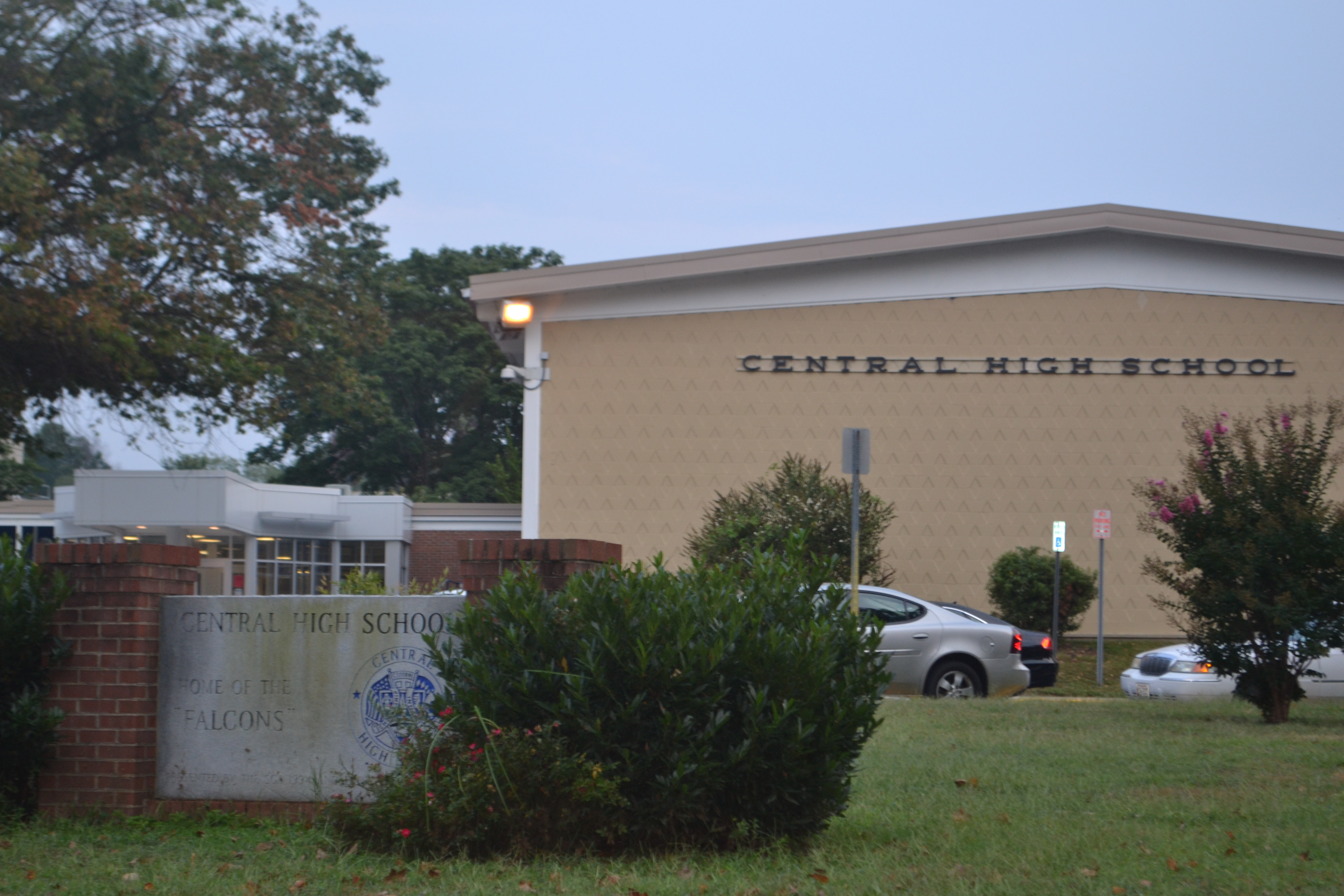
Central

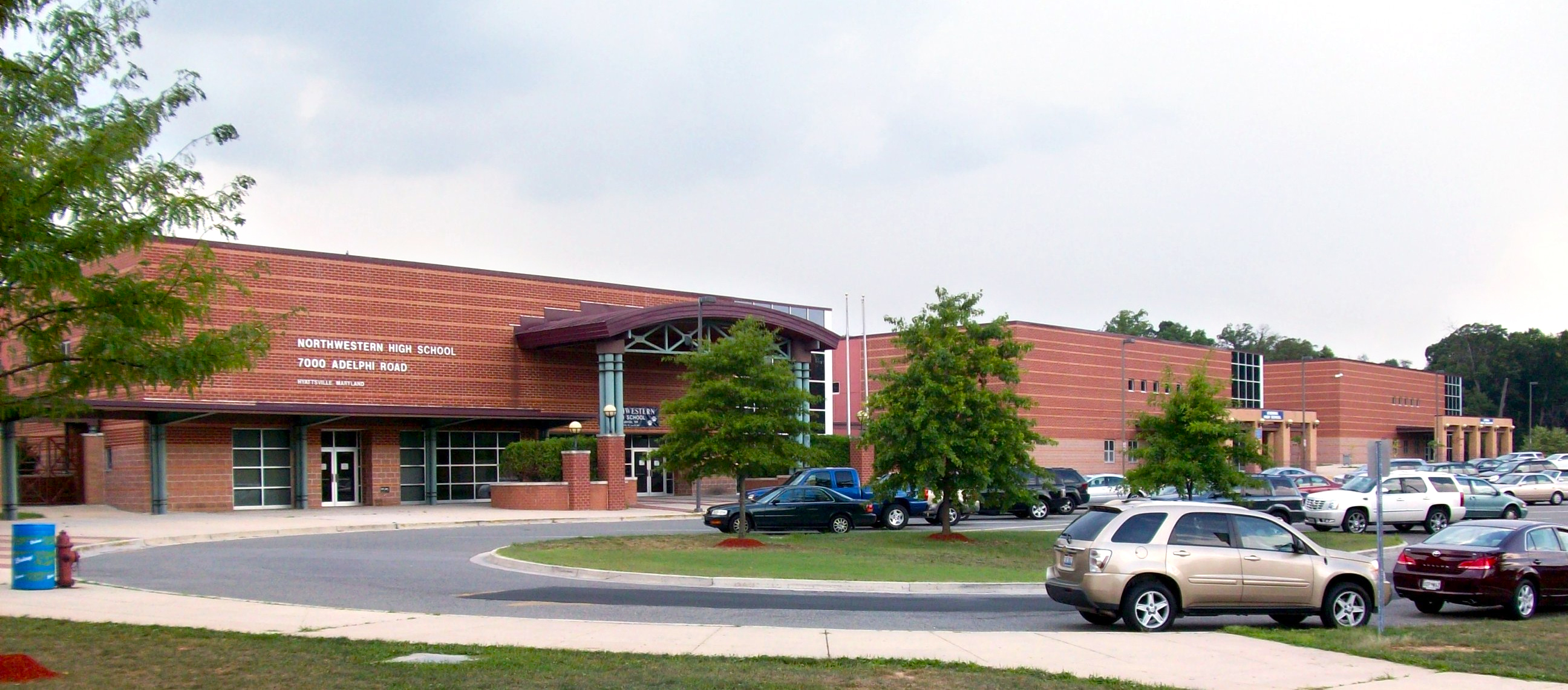
Northwestern

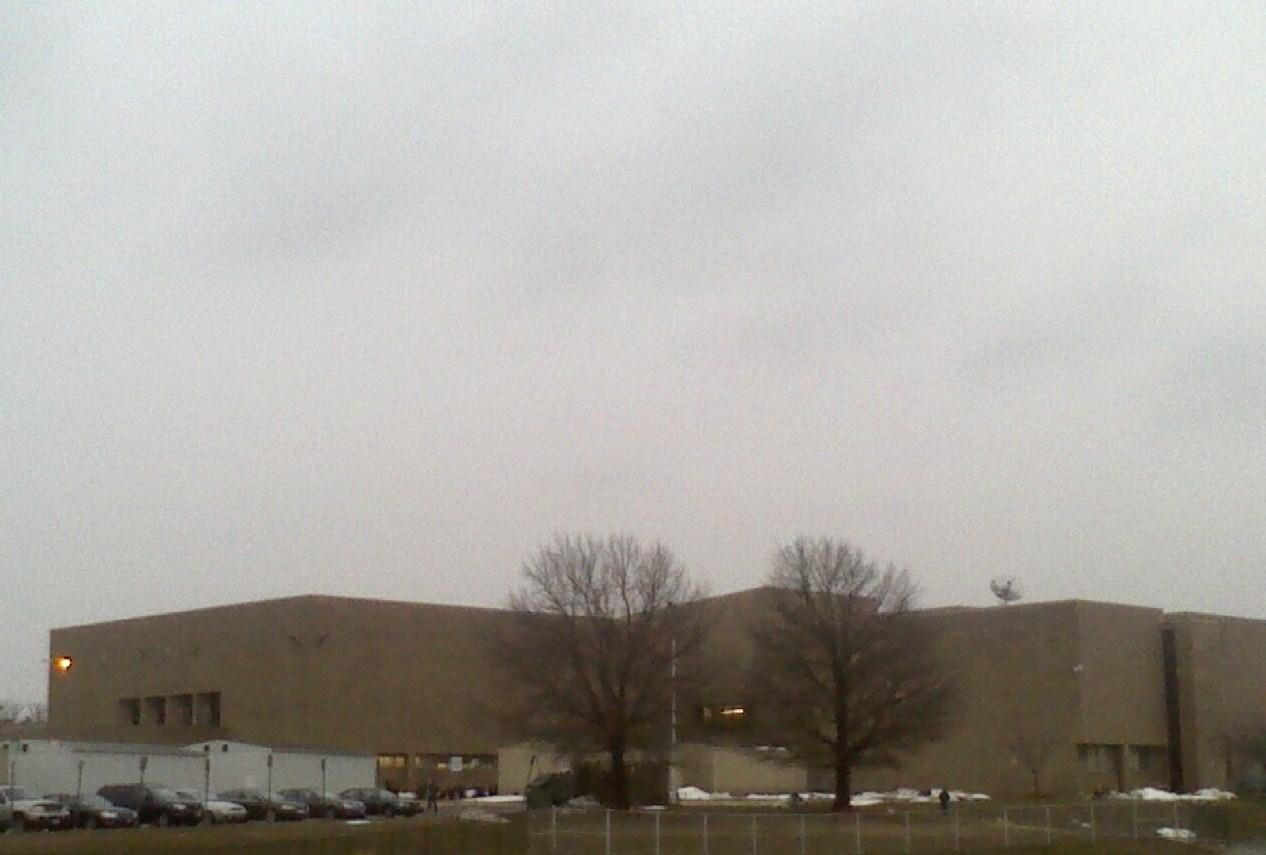
Roosevelt

=== Prince George's County Public Schools ===
- Bladensburg High School, Bladensburg
- Bowie High School, Bowie
- Charles Herbert Flowers High School, Springdale
- Crossland High School, Temple Hills
- DuVal High School, Lanham
- Eleanor Roosevelt High School, Greenbelt
- Friendly High School, Fort Washington
- Gwynn Park High School, Brandywine
- High Point High School, Beltsville
- Laurel High School, Laurel
- Northwestern High School, Hyattsville
- Parkdale High School, Riverdale
- Surrattsville High School, Clinton

==== Capitol Heights ====
- Central High School
- Fairmont Heights High School

==== Forestville ====
- Forestville Military Academy
- Suitland High School

==== Largo ====
- Academy of Health Sciences at Prince George's Community College
- Largo High School

==== Oxon Hill ====
- Oxon Hill High School
- Potomac High School

==== Upper Marlboro ====
- Frederick Douglass High School
- Dr. Henry A. Wise Jr. High School

=== Prince George's County public charter schools ===
- Chesapeake Math and IT Academy North High School, Laurel
- Chesapeake Math and IT Academy South High School, Upper Marlboro
- College Park Academy, Riverdale Park

=== Prince George's County non-public schools ===
St. Vincent Pallotti

- Al Huda School, College Park
- Belair Baptist Christian Academy, Bowie
- Bishop McNamara High School, Forestville
- Elizabeth Seton High School, Bladensburg
- From the Heart Christian School, Suitland
- Lanham Christian School, Lanham
- National Christian Academy, Fort Washington
- New Hope Academy, Landover Hills
- St. Vincent Pallotti High School, Laurel

==== Clinton ====
- Grace Brethren Christian School
- Independent Baptist Academy

==== Hyattsville ====
- Chelsea School
- DeMatha Catholic High School

==== Upper Marlboro ====
- Fairhaven School
- Riverdale Baptist School

== Queen Anne's County ==
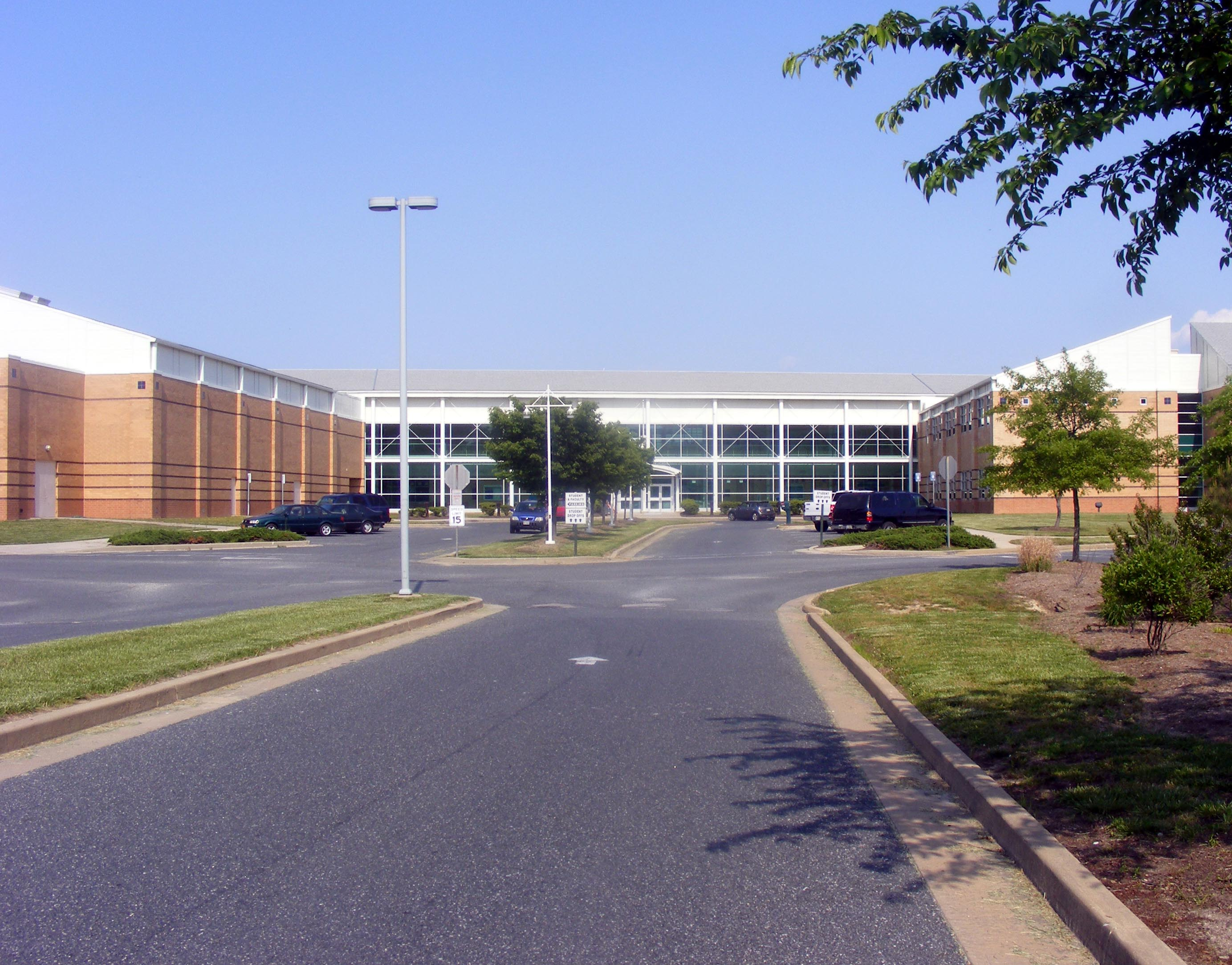
Kent Island

=== Queen Anne's County Public Schools ===
- Kent Island High School, Stevensville
- Queen Anne's County High School, Centreville

=== Queen Anne's County non-public schools ===
- Gunston Day School, Centreville
- Wye River Upper School, Centreville

== St. Mary's County ==
=== St. Mary's County Public Schools ===
- Chopticon High School, Morganza
- Great Mills High School, Great Mills
- Leonardtown High School, Leonardtown

=== St. Mary's County non-public schools ===
- The King's Christian Academy, Callaway
- Leonard Hall Junior Naval Academy, Leonardtown
- St. Mary's Ryken High School, Leonardtown

== Somerset County ==
=== Somerset County Public Schools ===
- Crisfield High School, Crisfield
- Washington High School, Princess Anne

=== Somerset County non-public school ===
- Holly Grove Christian School, Westover

== Talbot County ==
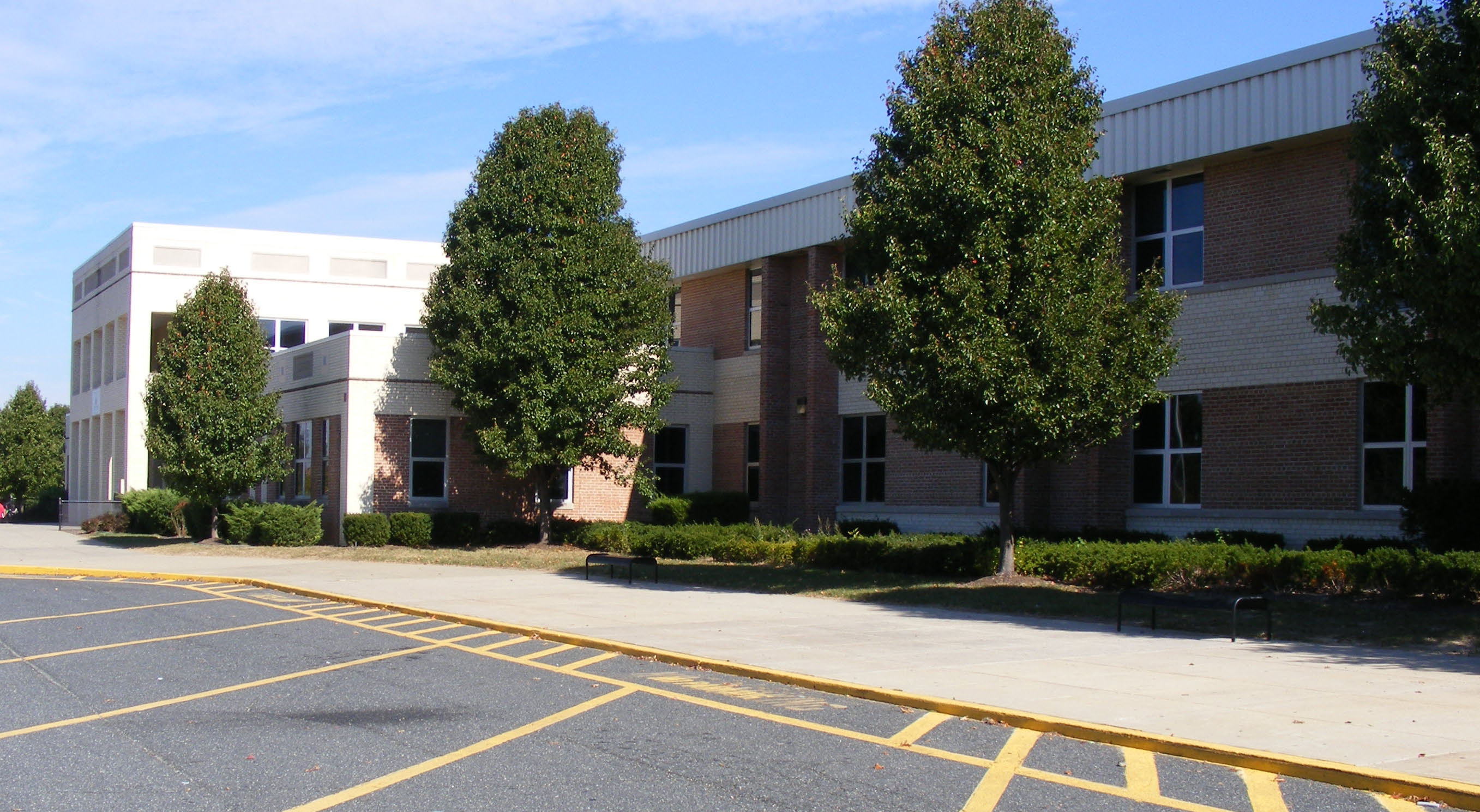
Easton High

=== Talbot County Public Schools ===
- Easton High School, Easton
- St. Michaels Middle/High School, St. Michaels

=== Talbot County non-public schools ===
- Chesapeake Christian School, Easton
- Saints Peter and Paul School, Easton

== Washington County ==
=== Washington County Public Schools ===
- Boonsboro High School, Boonsboro
- Clear Spring High School, Clear Spring
- Hancock High School, Hancock
- Smithsburg High School, Smithsburg
- Williamsport High School, Williamsport

==== Hagerstown ====
- Antietam Academy
- Barbara Ingram School for the Arts
- Evening High School
- North Hagerstown High School
- South Hagerstown High School
- Washington County Technical High School

=== Washington County non-public schools ===
- St. James School, St. James

==== Hagerstown ====
- Broadfording Academy
- Emmanuel Christian School
- Grace Academy
- Heritage Academy
- Highland View Academy
- St. Maria Goretti High School
- Truth Christian Academy

== Wicomico County ==
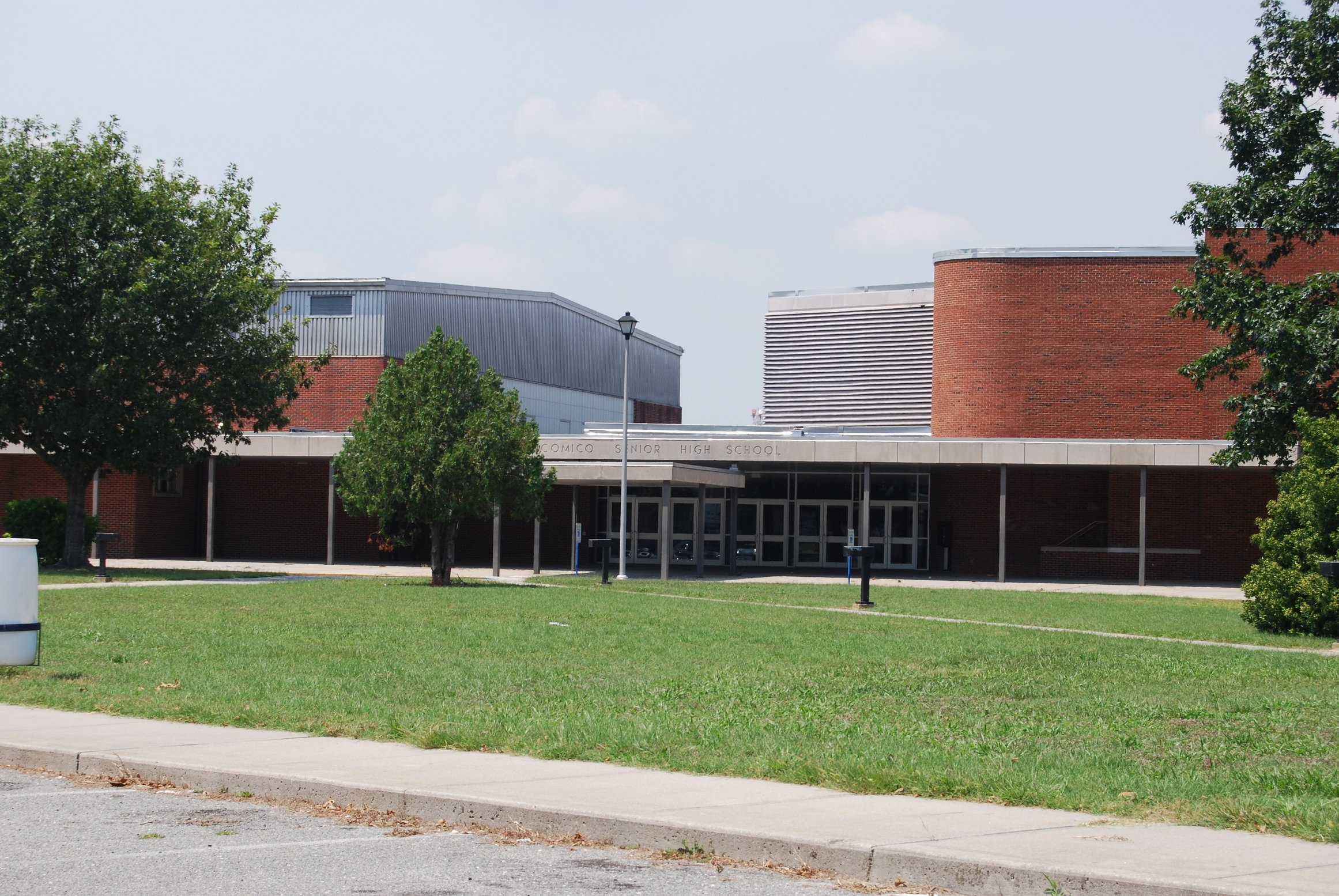
Wicomico High

=== Wicomico County Public Schools ===
- Mardela Middle and High School, Mardela Springs

==== Salisbury ====
- James M. Bennett High School
- Parkside High School
- Wicomico High School

=== Wicomico County non-public schools ===
- Faith Baptist School, Salisbury
- The Salisbury School, Salisbury
- Salisbury Christian School, Salisbury
- Saint Francis DeSales

== Worcester County ==
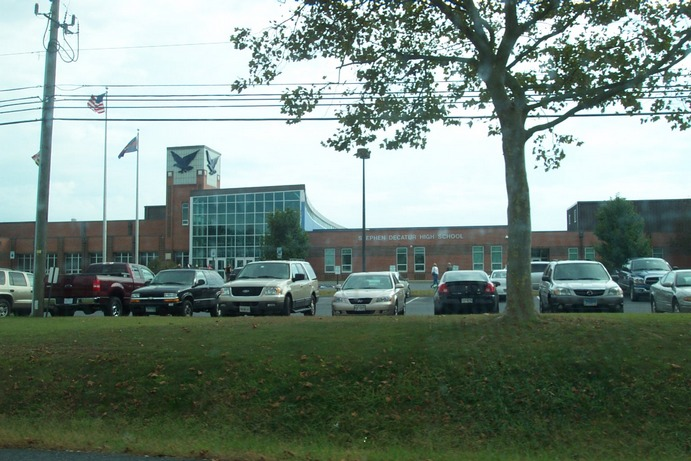
Stephen Decatur High School

=== Worcester County Public Schools ===
- Pocomoke High School, Pocomoke City
- Snow Hill High School, Snow Hill
- Stephen Decatur High School, Berlin
- Worcester Technical High School, Newark

=== Worcester County non-public school ===
- Worcester Preparatory School, Berlin

== See also ==
- List of school districts in Maryland
