= Manchester Valley High School =

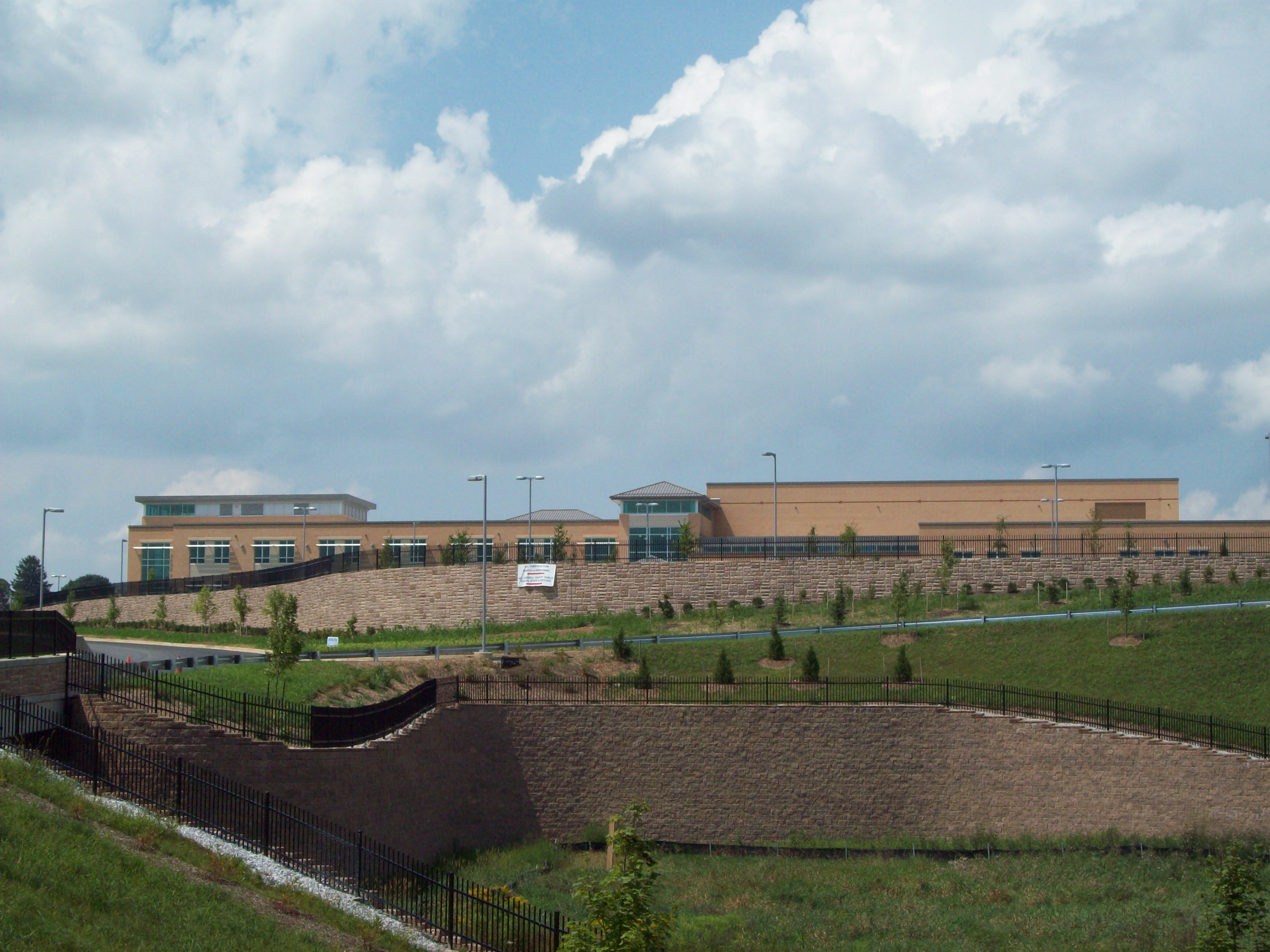

Location
- 3300 Maple Grove Road Manchester, Maryland; United States; 39.654°N 76.879°W

Information
- Type: Public Secondary
- Established: 2009
- School district: Carroll County Public Schools (Maryland)
- Principal: Joseph Guerra
- Grades: 9-11 (2009-2010) 9-12 (2010-Beyond)
- Enrollment: 1322
- Colors: Navy Blue and Silver
- Mascot: Maverick
- Website: https://mvh.carrollk12.org/

Manchester Valley High School is a high school located in Manchester, Carroll County, Maryland on the eastern coast of the United States.

Manchester Valley is located at 3300 Maple Grove Road. The school mascot is the Maverick, and the school colors are Navy Blue and Silver. The school is a part of the Carroll County Public Schools system.

== History ==
Manchester Valley High School was designed by Grimm and Parker Architects and opened for students in August 2009 relieving overcrowding at nearby North Carroll High School in Hampstead, Maryland. North Carroll had approximately 1,600 students, however the building was designed with a student capacity of only 1,339. Manchester Valley accepted around 800 students from North Carroll, bringing their student population down to about 60 percent. A new school community boundary was created to decide how to split students from North Carroll to Manchester Valley. The school was designed to have a student capacity of 1,294 pupils for grades 9 through 12. In its first year of operations the school only accepted students in grades 9 though 11 allowing seniors to graduate with their peers at North Carroll High School. Its first graduating class was on June 1, 2011. The school's first principal is Randy Clark who served as principal at Francis Scott Key High School in Union Bridge, Maryland before being selected for the job.

The school's mascot, the Maverick, a wild horse, was licensed from Mercy College in Dobbs Ferry, New York. Manchester Valley uses the structured academy model that is already in use at Century High School in Sykesville, Maryland and Winters Mill High School in Westminster, Maryland.
