= WMHS =

WMHS may refer to the following:

- WMHS (FM), a high school radio station (88.1 FM) at Thomas McKean High School in Pike Creek, Delaware
- Ward Melville High School, a Long Island public high school
- West Mesa High School a west-side Albuquerque, New Mexico, high school
- West Mesquite High School, a Mesquite, Texas, secondary school
- William McKinley High School, a fictional Lima, Ohio high school which is the main setting for the television series Glee
- West Milford High School, a Passaic County, New Jersey, public high school
- William Monroe High School, a Greene County, Virginia, public high school
- Winters Mill High School, a Westminster, Maryland, high school
- West Monroe High School, a Ouachita Parish, Louisiana, high school
