= Calvary Christian Academy =

Calvary Christian Academy may refer to:

- Calvary Christian Academy (Florida)
- Calvary Christian Academy (Maryland)
