= New Covenant Christian School =

New Covenant Christian School may refer to:

- New Covenant Christian School (Maryland)
- New Covenant Christian School (Lansing, Michigan)
