= Francis Scott Key High School =

Location
- 3825 Bark Hill Road; Union Bridge, Maryland; 21791; United States; 39°35′30″N 77°8′3″W

Information
- Type: Public High School
- Motto: We Are Key
- Established: 1959
- School district: Carroll County Public Schools
- Principal: David Herman (2024)
- Faculty: 140 teachers and staff
- Grades: 9-12
- Campus size: 24 acres (97,000 m^{2})
- Color: Blue White Red
- Athletics: Cross Country, Lacrosse, Track and Field, Volleyball, Softball, Tennis, Basketball, Baseball, Soccer, Field Hockey, Football, Wrestling.
- Mascot: Eagle
- Website: Official website

Francis Scott Key High School (FSK or simply "Key") is a four-year public high school in Union Bridge in Carroll County, Maryland, United States. The school is located near the west-central section of Carroll County.

== About the school ==
Francis Scott Key High School was established in 1959 in middle - nowhere MD as part of the Carroll County Public School system. The school is named after Francis Scott Key, the Frederick County, Maryland native author of the Star Spangled Banner, the national anthem for the United States. The building occupies 217,664 square feet (20,221.6 m^{2}) and was built in 1959.

The school celebrated their 50th anniversary during the 2008–2009 school year.

== Students ==
The student population at FSK steadily increased from 1993 to 2007, as shown by the list below. The graduation rate has fluctuated between 10% - 5% over the same time period. The student body is 20% minority as of 2024.

Student population

- 2007 1,284
- 2006 1,233
- 2005 1,227
- 2004 1,193
- 2003 1,155
- 2002 1,138
- 2001 1,096
- 2000 1,098
- 1999 1,078
- 1998 1,026
- 1997 1,002
- 1996 964
- 1995 917
- 1994 858
- 1993 806

== Sports ==
The superintendent of Carroll County Public Schools announced an investigation into the school's boys lacrosse team on May 11, 2021, arising from a complaint of racism during a game with Manchester Valley High School on May 10, 2021. Some Francis Scott Key players repeatedly hurled the "n-word" at a minority player for Manchester Valley, it was alleged. The Baltimore Sun quoted the superintendent as saying, "we're not going to tolerate this ... it needs to stop permanently".

Francis Scott Key High School has won the following state championships:

=== Volleyball ===
- 1977 B
- 1978 B
- 1980 C
- 1986 C
- 1996 1A
- 2009 2A

=== Field Hockey ===
- 1993 1A
- 1989 1A co-champions
- 1986 C
- 1978 B
- 1977 B

=== Boys' Soccer ===
- 1985 - C
- 1986 - C

=== Boys' Track & Field ===
- 1978 - B
- 1987 - C
- 1990 - 1A
- 1991 - 1A
- 1993 - 1A
- 1996 - 1A
- 1997 - 1A

== Notable alumni ==
- Guy Babylon - musician, played for Iron Butterfly and Elton John.
