= Carroll County Public Schools (Maryland) =

School district in Maryland, United States

Address
- 125 North Court Street Westminster, Maryland, USA
- Coordinates: 39°34′18.74″N 76°59′9.73″W

District information
- Type: Public
- Grades: K-12
- Superintendent: Cynthia McCabe (2022-present)
- Schools: 44
- NCES District ID: 2400210
- District ID: MD-06

Students and staff
- Students: 24,013 (2022-23)
- Teachers: 1855 (FTE; 2022-23)
- Student–teacher ratio: 13.90 (2022-23)

Other information
- Website: Official website

Carroll County Public Schools is a school district based in Westminster, Maryland. CCPS is the ninth largest county in the state of Maryland. Just over 24,000 students were enrolled in the county's public schools for the 2022-2023 academic year. The school system includes all of Carroll County, Maryland.

== Leadership ==
The schools are administered by superintendent Mrs. Cynthia McCabe. McCabe was appointed to a four-year term as Superintendent of Carroll County Public Schools effective July 1, 2022.

In 2022, the school board announced in the April meeting that pride flags would not be permitted to be “flown, posted, or affixed to the grounds, walls, doors, ceilings or any other Board of Education property," after a donation of flags from the local chapter of PFLAG were raised in classrooms. The school board has voted to develop a new policy on the use of political symbols, specifically flags, in school buildings, but the heated debate continues.

The board of education consists of five elected board of education members and one non-voting student member. As of July 2023, the members are President Marsha Herbert, Vice President Tara A. Battaglia, Patricia S. Dorsey, Donna M. Sivigny, and Stephen D. Whisler.

== Schools ==
=== High schools ===
- Francis Scott Key High School
- Liberty High School
- South Carroll High School
- Century High School
- Westminster High School
- Winters Mill High School
- Manchester Valley High School

=== Middle schools ===
- Crossroads Middle School
- East Middle School
- Mt. Airy Middle School
- North Carroll Middle School
- Northwest Middle School
- Oklahoma Road Middle School
- Shiloh Middle School
- Sykesville Middle School
- West Middle School

=== Elementary schools ===
- Carrolltowne Elementary School
- Cranberry Station Elementary School
- Ebb Valley Elementary School
- Eldersburg Elementary School
- Elmer A. Wolfe Elementary School
- Freedom District Elementary School
- Friendship Valley Elementary School
- Hampstead Elementary School
- Linton Springs Elementary School
- Manchester Elementary School
- Mechanicsville Elementary School
- Mt. Airy Elementary School
- Parr's Ridge Elementary School
- Piney Ridge Elementary School
- Robert Moton Elementary School
- Runnymede Elementary School
- Sandymount Elementary School
- Spring Garden Elementary School
- Taneytown Elementary School
- Westminster Elementary School
- William Winchester Elementary School
- Winfield Elementary School

=== Other schools ===
- Carroll County Career & Technology Center
- Carroll Springs School
- Gateway School
- Outdoor School
- Transitions Connections Academy
