= Century High School (Sykesville, Maryland) =

Public secondary school in Eldersburg, Maryland, US

Location
- 355 Ronsdale Road; Eldersburg, Maryland, Maryland 21784; United States; 39°25′32″N 76°59′30″W

Information
- Type: Public Secondary
- Established: 2001
- School district: Carroll County Public Schools
- Category: Public School
- NCES School ID: 240021001161
- Principal: Shannon Mobley
- Grades: 9–12
- Enrollment: 1,083
- Campus: 67.8 acres (274,000 m^{2})
- Colors: Emerald green, gold, black and white
- Mascot: Knights
- National ranking: National Blue Ribbon School
- Website: chs.carrollk12.org
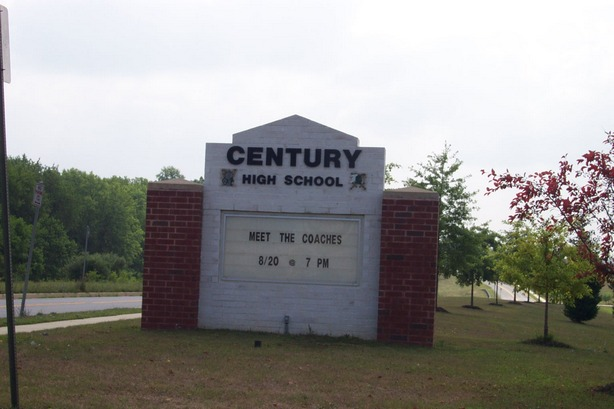
- Century High School Sign

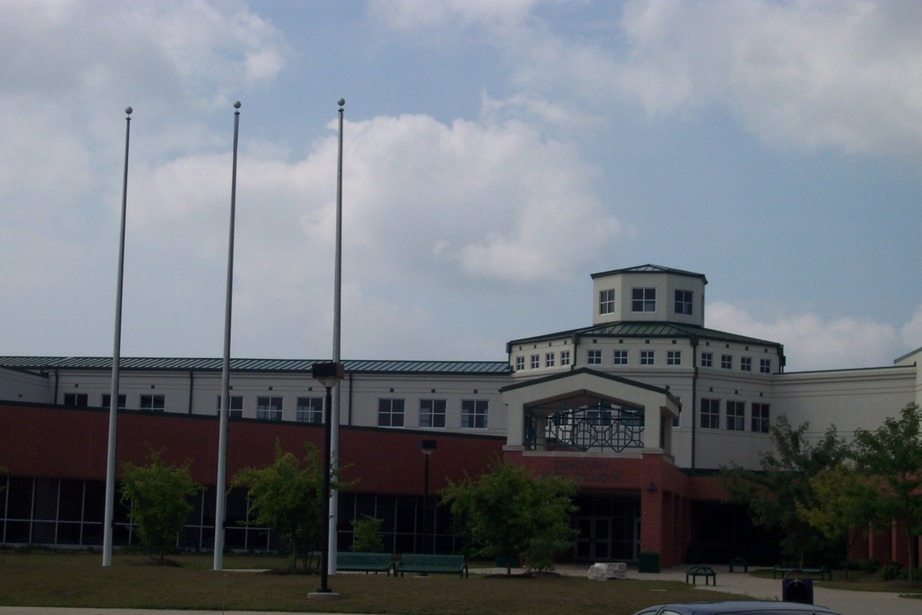
Century High School

Century High School is located in Eldersburg, Maryland, United States, within the Carroll County Public School District. The school was built in 2000–2001 on 65 acres of land and cost $21.2 million to complete. The building is 204,161 square feet in size.

The school's colors are emerald green, gold, black, and white, and the mascot is a knight, chosen by the original principal, Dave Booz after a community survey sent to parents and students in the district.

== History ==
With the rapid growth of southern Carroll County, a new high school was required to alleviate overcrowding at the nearby Liberty High School and South Carroll High School. It was named Century High School because it was founded at the turn of the 21st century.

== Academic Team ==
Century High School currently has an academic team and regularly participates in the local TV show, It's Academic.

== Drama ==
The drama club at Century High School performed Beauty and the Beast as their 2007 musical, the first school in the county to do so. In the past, they have done The Sound of Music, Guys and Dolls, The Diary of Anne Frank, Annie, The Mouse That Roared, Winnie the Pooh, How to Succeed in Business Without Really Trying, Romeo and Juliet, It's A Wonderful Life, Cinderella, Little Women, Treasure Island, Sweeney Todd, Into the Woods, Newsies, and White Christmas. In 2016, Century placed 2nd in the state at the International Thespian Society's Maryland State Festival with their performance of The Miracle Worker. CHS was the first school in Carroll County to have an outdoor theater for the school's Rude Mechanicals to perform on. The Rude Mechanicals is an acting troupe, named after the clowns in Shakespeare's A Midsummer Night's Dream. They perform Shakespeare skits both at Century and throughout the community.

== Athletics ==
=== State championships ===
- 2002 - Girls Soccer, Class 2A
- 2003 - Girls Soccer, Class 2A
- 2003 - Boys Soccer
- 2004 - Girls Lacrosse
- 2006 - Girls Lacrosse
- 2007 - Girls Lacrosse
- 2009 - Girls Lacrosse
- 2009 - Girls Cross Country, Class 2A
- 2010 - Girls Indoor Track
- 2010 - Girls Lacrosse
- 2010 - Girls Cross Country
- 2011 - Volleyball
- 2011 - Girls Indoor Track
- 2011 - Boys Indoor Track
- 2011 - Girls Cross Country
- 2013 - Boys Indoor Track
- 2013 - Boys Outdoor Track
- 2013 - Girls Soccer, Class 2A
- 2013 - Field Hockey
- 2015 - Boys Outdoor Track
- 2015 - Girls Lacrosse
- 2017 - Boys Indoor Track
- 2017 - Boys Outdoor Track
- 2017 - Girls Lacrosse
- 2018 - Boys Indoor Track
- 2018 - Baseball
- 2019 - Volleyball
- 2019 - Boys Soccer
- 2021 - Girls Lacrosse
- 2022 - Girls Soccer
- 2025 - Outdoor Marching Band [citation needed]
