= Calvary Christian Academy (Maryland) =

Private school in Cresaptown, Maryland, United States

Location
- 14517 McMullen Highway; Cumberland, MD, Maryland 21502; United States; 39°35′45″N 78°49′43″W

Information
- Type: Private Christian School
- Motto: Invest. Equip. Send.
- Religious affiliation: Calvary Baptist Church
- Established: 1973
- Grades: Daycare, Pre-K 3&4, K-12
- Colors: Blue and White
- Athletics conference: Mason Dixon Christian Conference
- Mascot: Eagles
- Website: https://www.calvaryeaglesmd.com/

Calvary Christian Academy (CCA) is a private Christian school located in Cresaptown, Maryland in Allegany County. It was established as an outreach of Calvary Baptist Church of Cresaptown in 1973.

== Purpose ==
Calvary Christian Academy is a school that has classes for grades PreK3 through 12th Grade. A full-time daycare is also operated all year. The School is accredited with the Middle States Association of Colleges and Schools and the Association of Christian Schools International. The daycare is licensed through the State of Maryland Department of Child Care.

== Athletics ==
For fall there is boys' soccer, girls' volleyball, middle school volleyball, and JCP soccer. In the winter there is boys' and girls' varsity basketball and bowling. In spring there is baseball and girls' soccer.

CCA is a member of the Mason Dixon Christian Conference for baseball, basketball, soccer, and volleyball; the bowling team completes in the Allegany County Interscholastic Bowling League.
