= Liberty High School (Maryland) =

Location
- 5855 Bartholow Rd. Eldersburg, Carroll County, Maryland 21784; United States; 39°24′48″N 76°57′10″W

Information
- School type: Public high school
- Motto: "Strive for Excellence"
- Established: 1980
- School district: Carroll County Public Schools
- Principal: Kenneth Goncz
- Faculty: 59.67(FTE)
- Grades: 9-12
- Enrollment: 1,007 (2024–2025)
- Student to teacher ratio: 16.79
- Campus size: 49.4 acres (200,000 m2)
- Campus type: Suburban
- Colors: Royal Blue and Gold
- Mascot: Lion
- Website: lhs.carrollk12.org

The mascot of Liberty High School, as seen in the main lobby

Liberty High School (LHS) is a four-year public high school in Eldersburg in Carroll County, Maryland.

== History ==
Liberty High School was established in 1980 in Eldersburg Maryland, as part of the Carroll County Public Schools system.

== Sports ==
- Fall
  - Cheerleading
    - Girls JV/Varsity
  - Cross-Country
    - JV/Varsity
  - Field Hockey
    - Girls JV/Varsity
  - Football
    - Boys JV/Varsity
  - Golf
    - JV/Varsity
  - Soccer
    - Boys JV/Varsity
    - Girls JV/Varsity
  - Volleyball
    - Girls JV/Varsity
- Winter
  - Basketball
    - Boys JV/Varsity
    - Girls JV/Varsity
  - Cheerleading
    - Girls JV/Varsity
  - Indoor Track and Field
    - JV/Varsity
  - Wrestling
    - JV/Varsity
- Spring
  - Baseball
    - Boys JV/Varsity
  - Lacrosse
    - Boys JV/Varsity
    - Girls JV/Varsity
  - Softball
    - Girls JV/Varsity
  - Tennis
    - Varsity
  - Outdoor Track & Field
    - JV/Varsity

=== State championships ===
- Softball: 2012
- Girls' Soccer: 1996
- Boys' Cross Country: 2003, 2004, 2005, 2015, 2016, 2017, 2018
- Girls' Cross Country: 2014, 2019
- Tennis 2022, 2023
- Girls' Field Hockey 1981, 1982
- Baseball 1997, 2004, 2026

== Clubs ==
- As of the 2024-2025 school year there are 45 clubs and organizations offered at Liberty High School.

=== Robotics ===
Liberty High School boasts the longest running robotics team in Carroll County. The FIRST Robotics Competition Team 2199, the Robo-Lions, is a student-run team that was founded as a Liberty High School sports team in the fall of 2006 following the collapse of the county wide team, 1464. However, the current relationship between the school and the team is a loose affiliation, with no legal ties, and the team is now open for membership from anyone living in Carroll County, Maryland.

In 2011, parents and teachers formed the non-profit PIE3 to fund robotics programs throughout Carroll County. In 2012, the Robo-Lions became a member of the Freedom Area Recreation Council. Currently, the team is working with Carroll County Public Schools to create a legal partnership with the school district.

==== Public outreach ====
The team focuses not only on the robot, but also on public outreach to promote the growth of STEM in Carroll County. Currently, the team is mentoring 6 elementary and middle school age FIRST LEGO League robotics teams, and the Robo-Lions have run the regional FLL Regional Competition, the Roar of the Robots, for the past 4 years. Additionally, team members also volunteer at competitions for FLL, FTC, and FRC.

In 2012, the Robot-Lions started a summer Lego Fun Camp; students age 7-11 learn to work with the FLL technology to complete basic tasks, as well as engaging in other engineering related activities and crafts. Initially the team only offered one session, however in 2013 (their second year running the camp) the team expanded the sessions offered to 3 due to popular demand. The team also offers a mentor training session for parents and teachers interested in mentoring FLL teams.

Public outreach also extends to community events, such as elementary and middle school science fairs, public library events, craft fairs, the American Cancer Society's Freedom Area Relay for Life, and events coordinated through the Freedom Area Recreation Council.

Additionally, the team works with Liberty High School clubs and organizations, including the drama club and the special education classroom, Learning for Independence. In 2010 the team built a robotic lamp post for the drama club's production of The Lion the Witch and the Wardrobe; in 2011, the team constructed a robotic crocodile for the drama club's production of Peter Pan (the robot won a Cappie for best prop).

The Robo-Lions have also been featured on Fox 45 News, twice.

==== Competitions and awards ====
- 2013: Entrepreneurship Award, Richmond Regional
- 2013: Regional Chairman's Award, Chesapeake Regional (Quarterfinalists)
- 2013: FIRST Championship
- 2016: Engineering Inspiration Award at the DC District Event
- 2017: Engineering Inspiration Award at Northern VA Qualifier
- 2020/21: Entrepreneurship Award at Haymarket, VA Qualifier and Imagery Award at in the Bromine Group
- 2022: 1st Place, Engineering Excellence, and Engineering Inspiration Award at DC Qualifier, Engineering Inspiration Award at the Chesapeake District Event qualifying for the FIRST World Championship
- 2023: Design Award at Bethesda, MD Qualifier, Autonomous Award at Timonium, MD Qualifier, team won 1st Place and Mentor Rose Young won the prestigious Woodie Flowers award at the Chesapeake District Event, qualifying the team for the FIRST World Championship for the second year in a row

=== Marching band ===
The Liberty High School Marching Band is known as the "Lions' Pride". In the past several years, the marching band has scored in the top two of their Atlantic coast competition circuit, the Tournament of Bands. The Lions' Pride marching band is currently a Group 4 Open class band and is ranked first in its local Chapter 5 region of the TOB tournament area. In addition, it hosts the highest-scoring Drum Major in the Atlantic Coast Championship of 2014.

In the years of 2018 and 2019 the Lions Pride Band broke TOB history by being the first Maryland band to win the Atlantic Coast Championship (ACC) back to back. In 2018 the Lions Pride Band Won ACCs for the first time ever with a score of 98.0 and awards for high music, visual and, drum major. Following up that season in 2019 for the first time in TOB history a Maryland band won the Atlantic Coast Championships back to back. They came away with a score of 96.2 and an award for high brass. Since then, they have also won ACCs in 2023 and 2025.
