= New Covenant Christian School (Maryland) =

Location
- Coordinates: 39°29′22″N 76°18′50″W

Information
- Website: www.newcovenantchristianschool.org

New Covenant Christian School (NCCS) is a private, classical Christian school in Abingdon, Maryland. It is composed of the Grammar School (K-6) and the Upper School (grades 7–12).

== Location ==
New Covenant Christian School is located at 128 Saint Mary's Church Road in Abingdon, Maryland. (This is also the address of New Covenant Presbyterian Church, although the school has its own wing of the building.) NCCS is a ministry of New Covenant Presbyterian Church (NCPC).

== School identity ==
The mascot of the school is the New Covenant Knight. The school colors are burgundy and navy blue.

A motto among the teachers and staff is "Sharpening minds, shepherding hearts, shaping lives." The mission statement of New Covenant Christian School is: "We exist to glorify God by assisting parents in training their children to be Biblically-minded servant-leaders through a Reformed, Christ-centered, classical education."

== Student body ==
Although the school is a ministry of New Covenant Presbyterian Church, it includes students from many different churches and faith backgrounds.

== House system ==
A house system was instated in the Upper School in September 2011. Students are assigned to four houses, all named after influential historical figures: Athanasius House, Augustine House, Calvin House, and Luther House. Each house is led by a student who serves as the House Captain. It is the Captain's job to manage house operations along with other house officers. The Captains and Delegates make up the Student Leadership Council (SLC), which works with faculty and administration to plan, organize, and manage many Upper School activities, such as social events, service projects, and competitions.

== History ==
The school was founded in 1999. At the start, only kindergarten and first grade were offered. In the following years, NCCS added one grade level until the school celebrated its first graduating class in 2010.

The school follows the classical model of education which is based on the structures of ancient and medieval education systems. Under this model, students progress through the trivium: grammar, logic, and rhetoric stages.

== Methodology ==
In kindergarten through sixth, the students progress through the grammar stage. During these years, a child's brain develops in such a way that he or she is able to easily memorize information. Lessons include instruction in the basics of grammar, phonics, mathematics, land formations, countries and capitals, names and dates of important people and events in history, and English and Latin vocabulary.

Grades seven through nine make up the logic phase (or dialectic phase). During these years, students naturally begin to question the world around them. The lessons in the logic years focus on reasoning skills: identifying relationships between facts and ideas, discerning fact from fallacy, etc. Essentially, the learning of facts continues from the grammar years and analytical skills are added to those facts.

The rhetoric phase is completed in grades ten through twelve. This phase is all about application. Students make practical use of the knowledge and skills they acquired in the grammar and logic phases. They are taught to creatively, eloquently, and effectively express themselves in writing and speech. There is also significant focus on debate in this phase.
