= Winters Mill High School =

High school in Westminster, Maryland

Location
- 560 Gorsuch Road; Westminster, Maryland 21157; United States; 39°34′17″N 76°58′36″W

Information
- Type: Public Secondary
- Established: 2002; 24 years ago
- School district: Carroll County Public Schools
- Principal: Brian Booz
- Teaching staff: 65.33 (on an FTE basis)
- Grades: 9-12
- Enrollment: 1,142 (2024-2025)
- Student to teacher ratio: 16.59
- Campus type: Rural fringe
- Colors: Burgundy, Silver, and White
- Athletics conference: 2A
- Nickname: The Falcons
- Rival: Westminster Owls
- Website: www.carrollk12.org/schools/high/wmh

Winters Mill High School is a high school in Westminster, Maryland, United States that was established in 2002.

== Demographics ==
The demographic breakdown of the 1,084 students enrolled in 2015-2016 was:

- Male - 51.0%
- Female - 49.0%
- Native American/Alaskan Native - 0.3%
- Asian/Pacific islanders - 2.9%
- Black - 7.9%
- Hispanic - 8.3%
- White - 78.5%
- Multiracial - 2.0%
- Other - 4.9%

23.6% of the students were eligible for free or reduced-cost lunch. In 2015–2016, Winters Mill was a Title I school.
