= List of schools in Harford County, Maryland =

Here is a list of schools in Harford County, Maryland. Both public schools, independent schools and some parochial schools are listed.

== Elementary schools ==
- Abingdon Elementary School
- Bakerfield Elementary School
- Bel Air Elementary School
- Church Creek Elementary School
- Churchville Elementary School
- Darlington Elementary School
- Deerfield Elementary School
- Dublin Elementary School
- Edgewood Elementary School
- Emmorton Elementary School
- Forest Hill Elementary School
- Forest Lakes Elementary School
- Fountain Green Elementary School
- George D. Libby Elementary School at Hillsdale
- Hall's Cross Road Elementary School
- Harford Academy
- Harford Christian School
- Harford Day School
- Harford Friends School
- Havre de Grave Elementary School
- Hickory Elementary School
- Homestead/Wakefield Elementary School
- Jarrettsville Elementary School
- Joppatowne Elementary School
- Liberty Leadership - An Acton Academy
- Magnolia Elementary School
- Meadowvalle Elementary School
- Norrisville Elementary School
- Northbend Elementary School
- North Harford Elementary School
- Prospect Mill Elementary School
- Red Pump Elementary School
- Ring Factory Elementary School
- Riverside Elementary School
- Roye-Williams Elementary School
- Trinity Lutheran Elementary School
- Old Post Road Elementary School
- William S. James Elementary School
- Youth's Benefit Elementary School (YBES)

== Middle schools ==
- Aberdeen Middle School
- Bel Air Middle School
- Edgewood Middle School
- Fallston Middle School
- Harford Christian School
- Harford Day School
- Harford Friends School
- Havre de Grace Middle School
- Magnolia Middle School
- North Harford Middle School
- Patterson Mill Middle School
- Southampton Middle School

== High schools ==
- Aberdeen High School
- Bel Air High School
- C. Milton Wright High School
- Edgewood High School
- Fallston High School
- Harford Technical High School
- Havre de Grace High School
- Joppatowne High School
- Patterson Mill High School
- North Harford High School

== Private high schools ==
- Harford Christian School
- The John Carroll School
- New Covenant Christian School
