= Erin Henderson =

American football player and coach (born 1986)

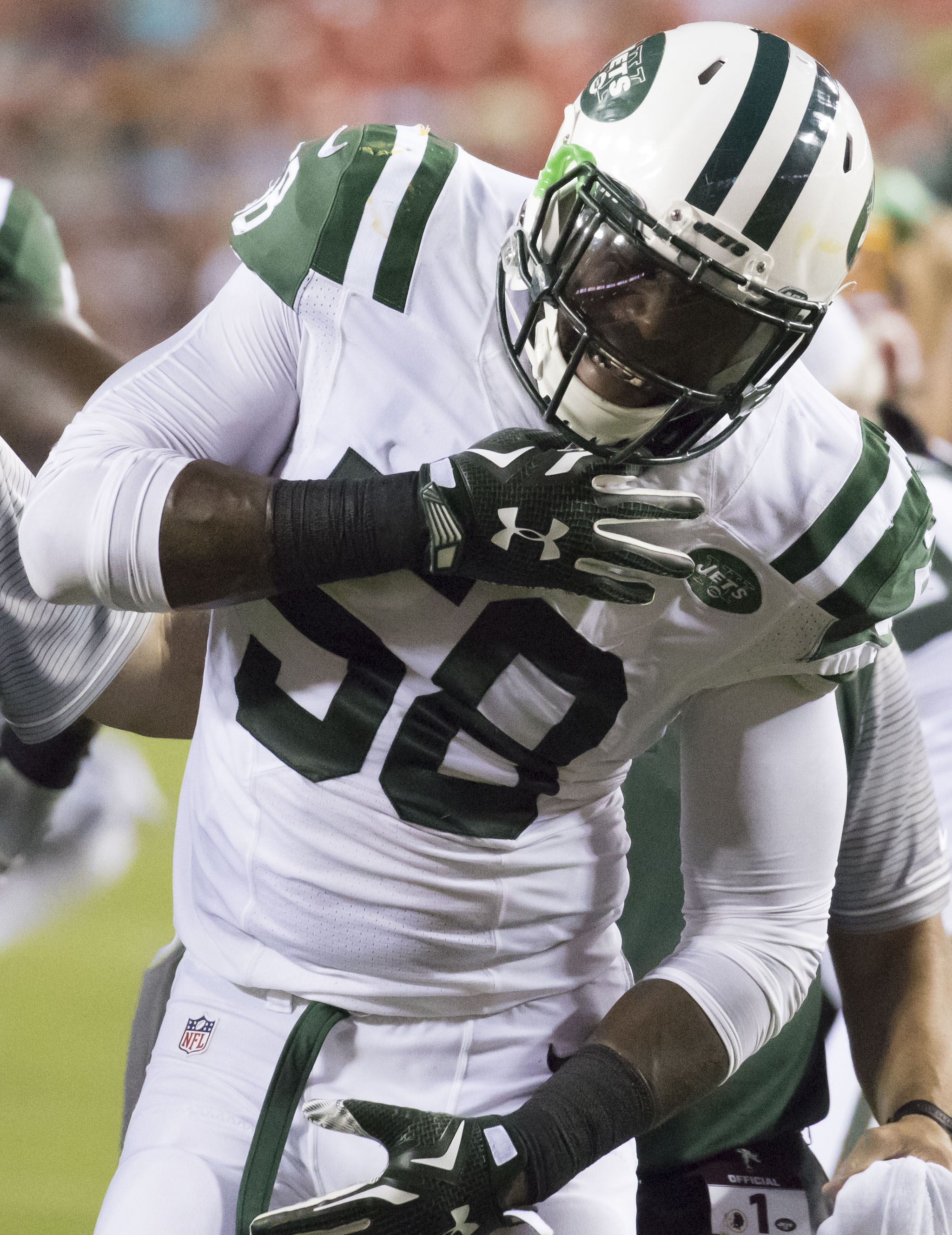
- Henderson with the New York Jets in 2016

Avila Eagles
- Title: Assistant linebackers coach

Personal information
- Born: July 1, 1986 (age 40); Aberdeen, Maryland, U.S.
- Listed height: 6 ft 3 in (1.91 m)
- Listed weight: 244 lb (111 kg)

Career information
- High school: Aberdeen
- College: Maryland (2004–2007)
- NFL draft: 2008: undrafted

Career history

Playing
- Minnesota Vikings (2008–2013); New York Jets (2015–2016)

Coaching
- Avila (2019–present) Assistant linebackers coach

Awards and highlights
- First-team All-ACC (2007); Second-team All-ACC (2006)

Career NFL statistics
- Total tackles: 361
- Sacks: 8.5
- Forced fumbles: 6
- Fumble recoveries: 2
- Interceptions: 2
- Stats at Pro Football Reference

Erin Henderson (born July 1, 1986) is an American former professional football player who was a linebacker in National Football League (NFL). He is currently an assistant linebackers coach at Avila University. He was signed by the Minnesota Vikings as an undrafted free agent in 2008. He played college football for the Maryland Terrapins.

== Early life ==
Henderson was born and raised in Aberdeen, Maryland. He played quarterback and linebacker for Aberdeen High School in Harford County, Maryland, and won the first state football championship in school history.

== College career ==
After redshirting his freshman year with the Terrapins, Henderson missed the entire 2005 season after tearing his left anterior cruciate ligament.

Henderson entered his redshirt sophomore year in 2006 at Maryland and started 12 of 13 games at linebacker. Henderson finished the season with 114 total tackles, 1 sack, 3 forced fumbles, and 2 interceptions. Henderson returned an interception for a TD in a close 28–26 victory at Virginia on October 14, 2006. Henderson had a season high 17 total tackles at Clemson on April 11, 2006. He earned second-team all-ACC honors while finishing 2nd in the conference in total tackles.

As a redshirt junior in 2007, Henderson recorded 133 total tackles, a forced fumble, 4 fumble recoveries, and an interception. Henderson had a season high and career high 18 total tackles versus Virginia on October 20, 2007. Henderson was a semi-finalist for the Dick Butkus Award, which went to James Laurinaitis of Ohio State. He led a 6–6 Maryland squad to the 2007 Emerald Bowl, where they lost to Oregon State.

== Professional career ==
Pre-draft measurables
Height	Weight	Arm length	Hand span	40-yard dash	10-yard split	20-yard split	20-yard shuttle	Three-cone drill	Vertical jump	Broad jump	Bench press
6 ft 2 3/4 in (1.90 m)	244 lb (111 kg)	34 in (0.86 m)	10 1/2 in (0.27 m)	4.73 s	1.59 s	2.72 s	4.50 s	7.16 s	31.0 in (0.79 m)	9 ft 5 in (2.87 m)	23 reps
All values from NFL Combine

=== Minnesota Vikings ===
During his rookie year, he played in 10 games and finished with 15 tackles. He mostly played on special teams and saw limited time on defense.

Henderson played in two regular season games for the Vikings in 2009, recording four tackles. He was suspended four games by the NFL on December 15, 2009, for violation of league's banned substances policy. Henderson won the starting job at weak-side linebacker at the start of the 2011 season.

Set to become an unrestricted free agent for the 2013 season, Henderson re-signed with the Vikings for a two-year contract. In the first regular-season game of 2013 against the Lions, Henderson recorded his first interceptions and got 11 tackles and 1 pass deflection.

He was released from the Vikings on February 7, 2014, after two suspected DUI arrests.

=== New York Jets ===
After being out of the league in 2014, Henderson signed with the New York Jets on April 8, 2015. On March 23, 2016, the Jets signed Henderson to a two-year contract for $3.1 million. On October 22, 2016, he was placed on the Reserve/Non Football Illness list.

On February 25, 2017, the Jets declined Henderson's option, making him a free agent.

== NFL career statistics ==
Legend
**Bold**	Career high

=== Regular season ===
Year	Team	Games		Tackles					Interceptions					Fumbles			
Year	Team	GP	GS	Cmb	Solo	Ast	Sck	TFL	Int	Yds	TD	Lng	PD	FF	FR	Yds	TD
2008	MIN	10	0	15	14	1	0.0	0	0	0	0	0	0	1	0	0	0
2009	MIN	2	0	4	4	0	0.0	0	0	0	0	0	0	0	**1**	0	0
2010	MIN	9	0	13	11	2	0.0	0	0	0	0	0	0	0	**1**	**3**	0
2011	MIN	15	11	70	44	26	1.5	7	0	0	0	0	2	**2**	0	0	0
2012	MIN	14	10	80	50	30	3.0	7	0	0	0	0	**3**	1	0	0	0
2013	MIN	14	**12**	**113**	**70**	**43**	**4.0**	**12**	**2**	**19**	0	**10**	**3**	1	0	0	0
2015	NYJ	**16**	0	45	36	9	0.0	1	0	0	0	0	1	1	0	0	0
2016	NYJ	5	4	21	12	9	0.0	1	0	0	0	0	0	0	0	0	0
Total		85	37	361	241	120	8.5	28	2	19	0	10	9	6	2	3	0

=== Playoffs ===
Year	Team	Games		Tackles					Interceptions					Fumbles			
Year	Team	GP	GS	Cmb	Solo	Ast	Sck	TFL	Int	Yds	TD	Lng	PD	FF	FR	Yds	TD
2008	MIN	**1**	0	1	1	0	0.0	0	0	0	0	0	0	0	0	0	0
2012	MIN	**1**	**1**	**8**	**2**	**6**	0.0	**1**	0	0	0	0	0	0	0	0	0
Total		2	1	9	3	6	0.0	1	0	0	0	0	0	0	0	0	0

== Coaching career ==
In 2019, Henderson became an assistant linebackers coach for Avila University. He has also volunteered as an assistant football coach at his former high school, Aberdeen.

== Personal life ==
Henderson is the younger brother of former linebacker E. J. Henderson. They both played college football for the Maryland Terrapins.

Henderson was arrested on suspicion of DUI in November 2013 and again January 1, 2014.

Henderson was charged with a DWI and possession of ten grams of marijuana on February 27, 2014, after being released from the Vikings earlier that month. On May 7, 2014, he was sentenced to two years of probation after he pleaded guilty to the latter DWI charge.

On September 29, 2017, it was announced that Henderson filed a lawsuit against the New York Jets for failing to accommodate his disability with his bipolar disorder and wrongful termination, which cost him more than $3 million.

Henderson became a substitute eighth-grade math teacher after his playing career.
