= Kim Waters =

American jazz saxophonist (born 1965)

- Born: March 20, 1965 (age 61); Havre de Grace, Maryland, U.S.
- Genres: Jazz
- Occupation: Musician
- Instrument: Saxophone
- Years active: 1989-present
- Label: Waterfall Records Shanachie Records Red River Entertainment
- Website: kimwaters.net

Kim Waters (born March 20, 1965) is an American jazz artist born in Havre de Grace, Maryland.

== Early life ==
Waters grew up in Harford County, Maryland. Waters learned how to play the saxophone at a young age. He attended C. Milton Wright High School. He played on the basketball team and was a shooting guard. Waters and his brothers formed a band early in their career.

== Career ==
=== Early career ===
In 1989 Waters debuted with his album, Sweet and Saxy. In 1991 his album Sax Appeal was released and in 1993 his album Peaceful Journey. In 1994, It’s Time for Love was released.

=== Shanachie Records (1997–2013) ===
In 1998, Waters released his first album under Shanachie Records, Love's Melody. He released several albums under Shanachie Records including In the Name of Love and You Are My Lady.

=== Red River Entertainment (2013–2016) ===
In 2013 Waters released his album, My Loves, under Red River Entertainment. The album also had appearances from Glenn Jones and Waters’ wife, Dana Pope. In his next album, Silver Soul, Waters had appearances from Zendaya and Eric Roberson.

=== Shanachie Records (2016–present) ===
In 2016 Waters returned to Shanachie Records with his album, Rhythm and Romance. The album peaked at number 12 on Jazz Album charts.

=== The Sax Pack ===
In 2008, Kim Waters, Jeff Kashiwa, and Steve Cole formed The Sax Pack. Their debut album, The Sax Pack, was released in 2008 under Shanachie Records. The album peaked at number 13 on the Billboard charts. In 2009, the album, The Pack is Back, was released and peaked at number 16 on Billboard Charts. In 2012, Kim Waters was replaced by Marcus Anderson in the touring band. In 2015, The Power of 3 was released with Kim Waters appearing again on the studio release.

== Discography ==
=== Solo albums ===
- 1989 Sweet and Saxy
- 1990 All Because of You
- 1991 Sax Appeal
- 1992 Tribute
- 1993 Peaceful Journey
- 1994 It's Time for Love
- 1994 Home for Christmas
- 1996 You Are Not Alone
- 1998 Love's Melody
- 1999 One Special Moment
- 2001 From the Heart
- 2002 Someone to Love You
- 2004 In the Name of Love
- 2005 All for Love
- 2007 You Are My Lady
- 2008 I Want You: Love in the Spirit of Marvin Gaye
- 2010 Love Stories
- 2011 This Heart of Mine
- 2013 My Loves
- 2014 Silver Soul
- 2015 My Gift to You
- 2016 Rhythm with Romance
- 2018 What I Like
- 2020 Shakedown
- 2022 That Special Touch

=== Albums with Sax Pack ===
- 2008 The Sax Pack
- 2009 The Pack is Back!
- 2015 Power of 3
