= Patterson Mill Middle and High School =

School in Bel Air, Maryland, US

Location
- 85 Patterson Mill Road; Bel Air, Maryland; United States
- 39.5073°N 76.3243°W

Information
- Type: Public high school
- Established: 2007; 19 years ago
- School district: Harford County Public Schools
- NCES School ID: 240039001638 (HS); 240039001638 (MS)
- Principal: Ms. C. Brooke Harrell
- Grades: 6-12
- Gender: Co-educational
- Enrollment: Combined: 1579; HS: 819; MS: 760
- Campus size: 226,000 sq ft (21,000 m^{2})
- Campus type: Suburban
- Colors: Black, silver and teal
- Mascot: Huskies
- Website: https://pmmhs.hcpsschools.org/

Patterson Mill Middle and High School is a comprehensive middle and high school situated on a 78-acre campus just south of Bel Air, Maryland, United States. It is part of the Harford County Public Schools system.

== History ==
Patterson Mill Middle and High School opened in August 2007. Built for $50 million, the 226,000 sq ft (21,000 m^{2}) building includes a television studio, a mass communications lab for a radio station, and a graphics and visual communications area. The first graduating class was the class of 2010.

== Principals ==
- Wayne Thibeault -- 2007-2013
- Dr. Sean Abel Ed.D -- 2013-2024
- C. Brooke Harrell -- 2024-Present

== Campus ==
The building consists of 66,000 square feet (6,100 m^{2}) of instructional space. Site-specific facilities include such items as: a mass communications lab with a radio station, a television studio, a black box theater, an auditorium that seats 900 people, a sculpture studio, a graphics lab, a visual communications lab, a child development lab and center, a clothing/design lab, computer labs, a pre-engineering lab, a flex (foreign language) program for all eighth-graders, and multiple Seminar and Extended Learning Rooms. The classrooms in the building are equally outfitted for the 21st century, with LCD projectors, interactive white boards, high definition televisions, laptop computers, desktop computers, and other traditional media found in most standard classrooms.

== Athletics ==
Patterson Mill competes at the varsity and junior varsity level in the Upper Chesapeake Bay Athletic Conference in all offered sports. The sports offered at Patterson Mill include baseball, boys' and girls' basketball, boys' and girls' lacrosse, boys' and girls' soccer, boys' and girls' volleyball, cheerleading, cross-country, field hockey, football, golf, softball, swimming, tennis, track and field, and wrestling.

In 2008, Patterson Mill captured the UCBAC Susquehanna Division titles in cross country and boys' soccer. The field hockey team also won the 1A North regional championship.

In Spring 2009, the women's lacrosse team won the 2A-1A South regional championship and continued on to compete in the 2A-1A state championship game.

In Fall 2010, the Huskies Field Hockey team competed at the state championship level against Pocomoke High School, losing 0-1. This was the first trip to state finals for the Lady Huskies.

The Huskies have three state championships, coming in 2A Women's Basketball, 2014, and 2015, and 1A Women's Basketball in 2017. The school also won a state championship in the girls 4 by 200-meter relay in 2016. The huskies lacrosse team has won back-to-back 1a state championships in 2018 and 2019.

The success of the Huskies Wrestling Team is another to mention. In 2011, they crowned their first state champion, Zach Cullinson. Later, in 2018, Hunter Crowley went 40-0, winning the county, regional, and state tournaments. Subsequently, becoming the second Patterson Mill State Champion. In 2018, The Huskies went on to win their first regional championship against Perryville High School in the finals. They won again in 2019 against Colonel Richardson High School. Then again, in 2020, defeating Perryville once more. Resulting in three consecutive regional championships.

In Spring 2022, the Patterson Mill Tennis team sent a Men's Doubles team to the 1A state tournament. The duo made it to the state final before losing to Liberty High School.

In Spring 2024, the Patterson Mill Tennis team sent a Women's Doubles team to the 1A state tournament. The pair made it to the state quarterfinal before losing to South Carroll High School.

Also in Spring 2024, the Huskies baseball team made it to the state finals, where they were defeated 1-4 by Brunswick High School. The Huskies softball team also made it far in the competition.

In Fall 2025, the huskies Girls Volleyball team made it to the state finals, losing to Clear Spring High School in the 5th set.

== See also ==
- List of Schools in Harford County, Maryland
