= C. Milton Wright High School =

Public secondary school in Harford County, Maryland, United States

Location
- 1301 N Fountain Green Rd; Bel Air, Maryland 21015; United States; 39°33′42″N 76°19′49″W

Information
- Type: Public secondary
- Motto: The Wright Beginning Promises a Great Future.
- Established: 1980
- School district: Harford County Public Schools
- Principal: Bryan Pawlicki
- Teaching staff: 74 (2021)
- Grades: 9–12
- Enrollment: 1,269 (2022)
- Campus: Suburban
- Colors: Carolina blue, black & white
- Mascot: Mustangs
- Website: cmhs.hcpsschools.org/o/cmhs
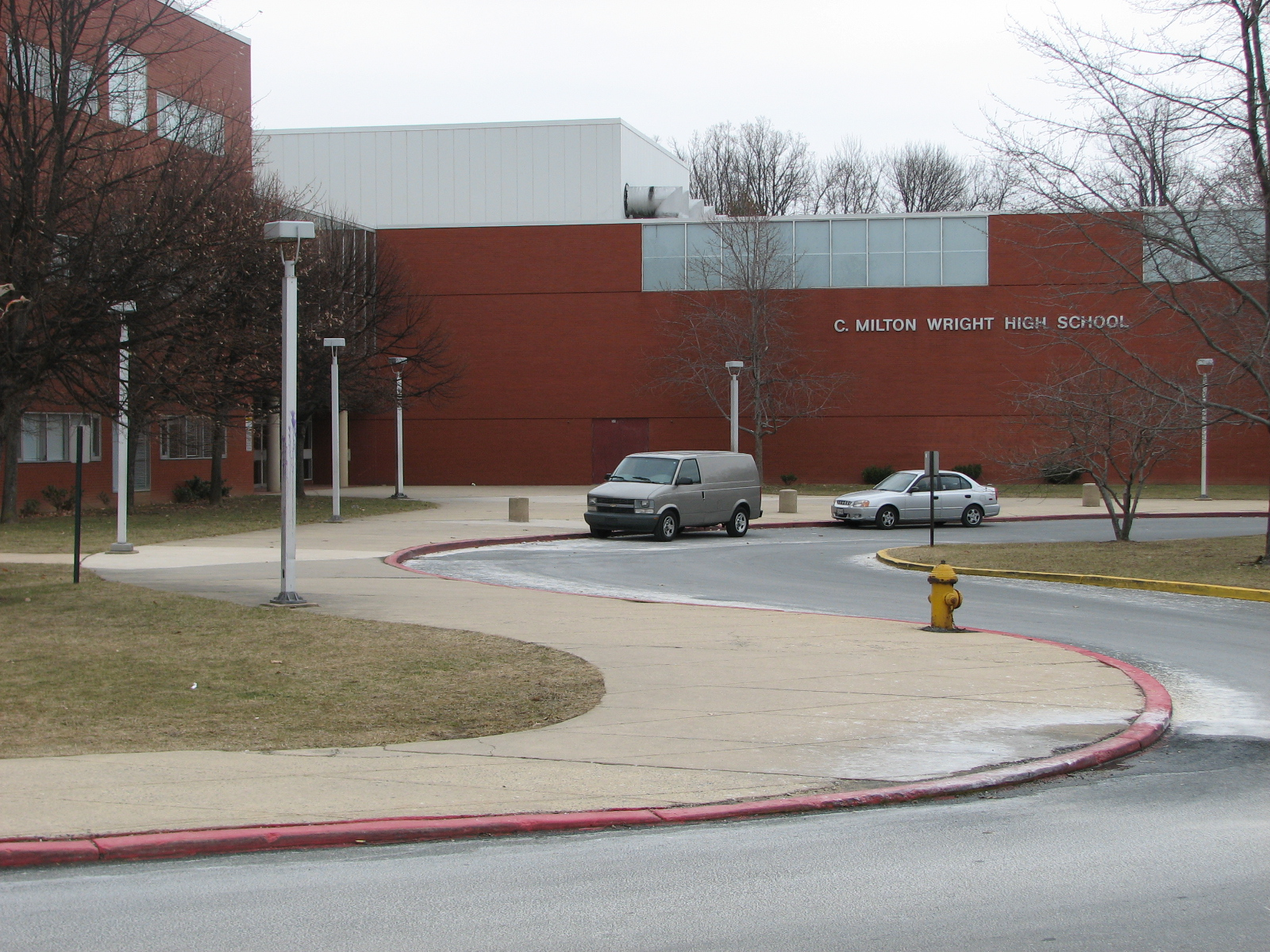
- Main entrance to C. Milton Wright High School

C. Milton Wright High School is a public secondary school located in Bel Air, Maryland, United States. It was founded in 1980 with Robert Garbacik as its first principal. The school is named after Charles Milton Wright, a former superintendent of the Harford County Public Schools system. It ranks #4 within the Harford County Public Schools 55 public schools in the district, and ranks #128 within all of the Maryland Schools.

== School information ==
C. Milton Wright High School offers 19 Advanced Placement (AP) classes.

== Athletics ==
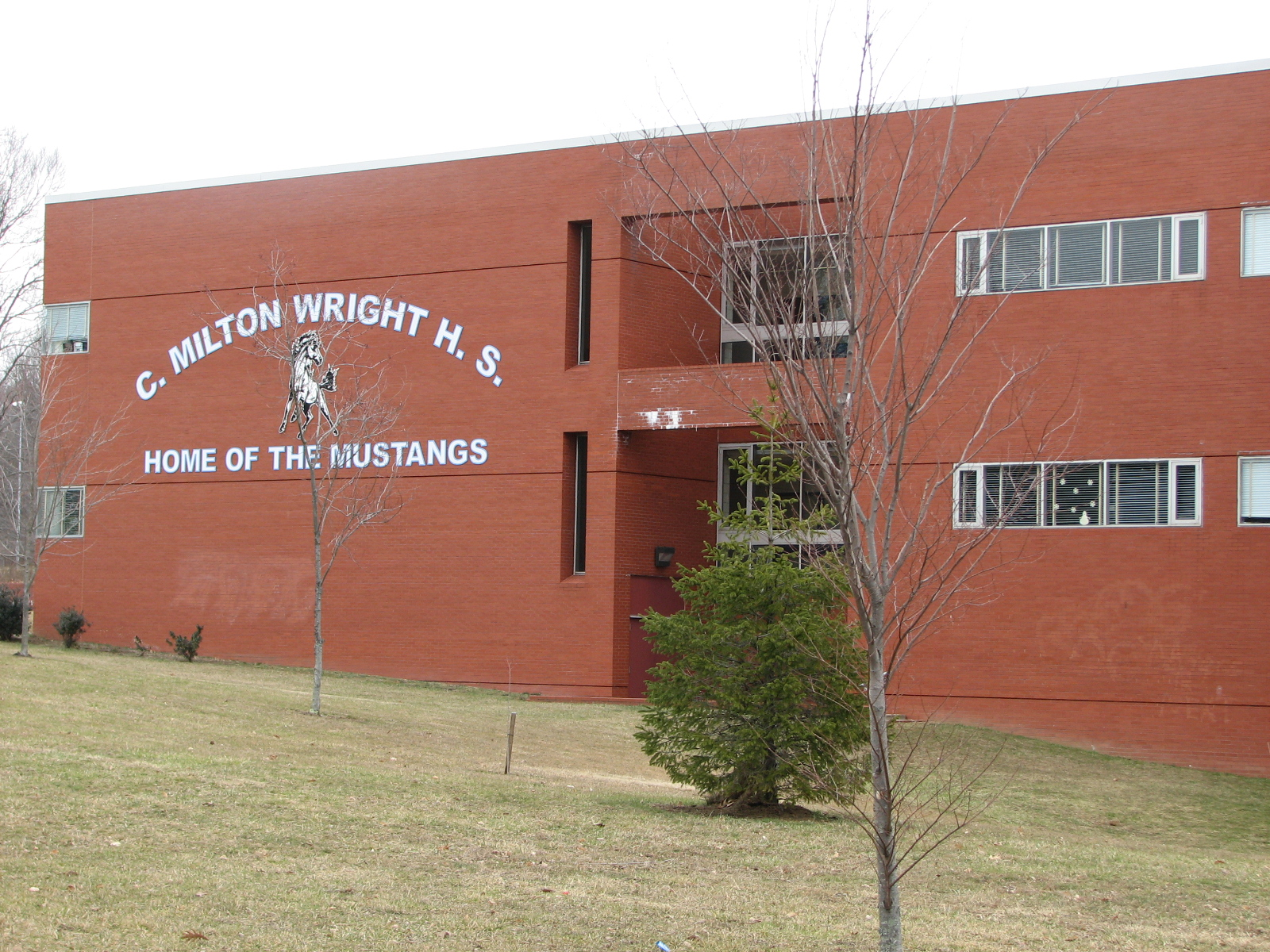
Exterior facade, showing mascot and school colors

At C. Milton, many students participate in multiple sports throughout the school year. The C. Milton Wright High School baseball program ranks among the elite in the United States. Since 2006, the Mustangs have appeared in the Maryland State Championship three times, winning the title in their latest appearance (2010). With a final record of 23–0, C. Milton was ranked 8th nationally and 1st on the east coast by the "USA Today Super 25 High School Baseball Poll."

C. Milton Wright's Cross Country Teams won Maryland state titles in 1988, 1999, 2000, 2001, 2002, 2004, 2007, and 2008, qualifying for Nike Team Nationals in 2004, being Maryland state runners-up in 1985, 1992, 1993, 1994, 1996, 1998, 2001, 2002, and 2003, and winning the Harford County Championship every year for 21 years from 1987 to 2008. The team recently was state runners-up in 2017.

C. Milton Wright's basketball team became state champions in 2016.

- Fall Sports:
  - Men's Soccer
  - Women's Soccer
  - Men's Volleyball
  - Women's Volleyball
  - Cross Country
  - Golf
  - Football
  - Fall Cheerleading
  - Field Hockey
- Winter Sports:
  - Swimming
  - Indoor Track
  - Wrestling
  - Men's Basketball
  - Women's Basketball
  - Winter Cheerleading
- Spring Sports:
  - Men's Basebell
  - Women's Softball
  - Tennis
  - Track & Field
  - Lacrosse

== Honors societies and selective groups ==
- National Honor Society
- Spanish National Honor Society
- French National Honor Society
- German National Honor Society
- National Art Honor Society
- Mu Alpha Theta (Math National Honors Society)
- Science National Honor Society
- Rho Kappa (Social Studies Honors Society)
- Tri-M Music Honor Society
- International Thespian Society

== Competitive teams ==
- Forensics
- Speech & Debate
- Mock Trial
- Academic Team
- Envirothon Team
- Math League
- Mustang Cheerleading Team

== Event planning groups ==
- Student Government Association (SGA)
- Sophomore Class Council
- Junior Class Council
- Senior Class Council

== Notable alumni ==
- Colin Miller – United Soccer League, goalkeeper
- Jay Witasick – Major League Baseball, pitcher
- Kim Waters – jazz saxophonist
