= Harford Glen Environmental Education Center =

Environmental education center

- Interactive map of Harford Glen Environmental Education Center
- Location: Bel Air, Harford, Maryland, United States
- Coordinates: 39°29′10″N 76°20′30″W
- Area: 320 acres (130 ha)
- Elevation: 59 ft (18 m)
- Established: 1948
- Governing body: Harford County Public Schools
- Website: Harford Glen Environmental Education Center

Harford Glen Environmental Education Center is a division of Harford County Public Schools and is involved in environmental and elementary education. The park, which is open to the public during the summer and on weekends is located on Winters Run. Harford Glen was also the host of the 13th annual Maryland Envirothon state level event in 2002.
