= Edgewood High School (Edgewood, Maryland) =

Coordinates: 39.4225°N 76.2874°W

Location
- 2415 Willoughby Beach Road; Edgewood, Maryland; United States

Information
- Type: Public Secondary
- Established: 1954, Renovated = 2010
- School district: Harford County Public Schools
- Principal: Sandra J. McMichael
- Faculty: 82.93 (FTE)
- Grades: 9–12
- Enrollment: 1,403 (2017–18)
- Student to teacher ratio: 16.92
- Colors: Red, White
- Mascot: Ram
- Feeder schools: Edgewood Middle School
- Website: https://edhs.hcpsschools.org/o/edhs
- Edgewood's main entrance

Edgewood High School (EHS) is a four-year public high school in Edgewood in Harford County, Maryland, United States. The school is located in the southern portion of the county near U.S. Route 40. It is home to the International Baccalaureate program for Harford County, as well as the Academy of Finance and the Teacher Academy of Maryland (TAM) programs.

== About the School ==
=== Facilities ===
The former Edgewood High School building was 189,856 square feet (17,638.2 m^{2}) on slightly more than 48 acres (190,000 m^{2}) and according to Maryland state records, the primary structure was built in 1954. Since that time, it was renovated or added to five times, in the years 1958, 1967, 1969, 1975, and 1996. With the recent population growth in Harford County, combined with the expected population growth due to BRAC, it was decided to build a new school building on the same grounds. Completed in 2010, the new building is 268,000 square feet (24,900 m^{2}) and increases the student capacity by 361 seats, to 1380.

The building was opened for the 2010–2011 school year. The demolition and removal of the former building was completed by the end of the 2010–2011 school year.

=== Programs ===
==== Fine Arts ====
Music and the arts are programs at Edgewood High School. The school is known for its musical and theater productions, and in 2003, the Edgewood High School band was selected by Walt Disney World to perform there.

Edgewood's high school instrumental program currently has approximately 210 members, and the vocal program numbers approximately 120. The department also offers courses in music theory, as well as beginning and advanced piano, guitar, and percussion classes. The department produces two or three concerts per year for each ensemble, with the winter concert combining the ensembles, and the spring concerts divided by the parts of the department (orchestral, other instrumental, and choral).

== Magnet Programs ==
=== IB Diploma Program ===
Edgewood High School is one of the elite schools offering the International Baccalaureate degree program. Freshman application is available to Grade 8 students.

=== Academy of Finance ===
Logo of Edgewood's Academy of Finance

In March 1998, the Maryland State Department of Education joined with the National Academy Foundation to develop local partnerships between businesses and schools to create programs that combine work experience with classroom learning.

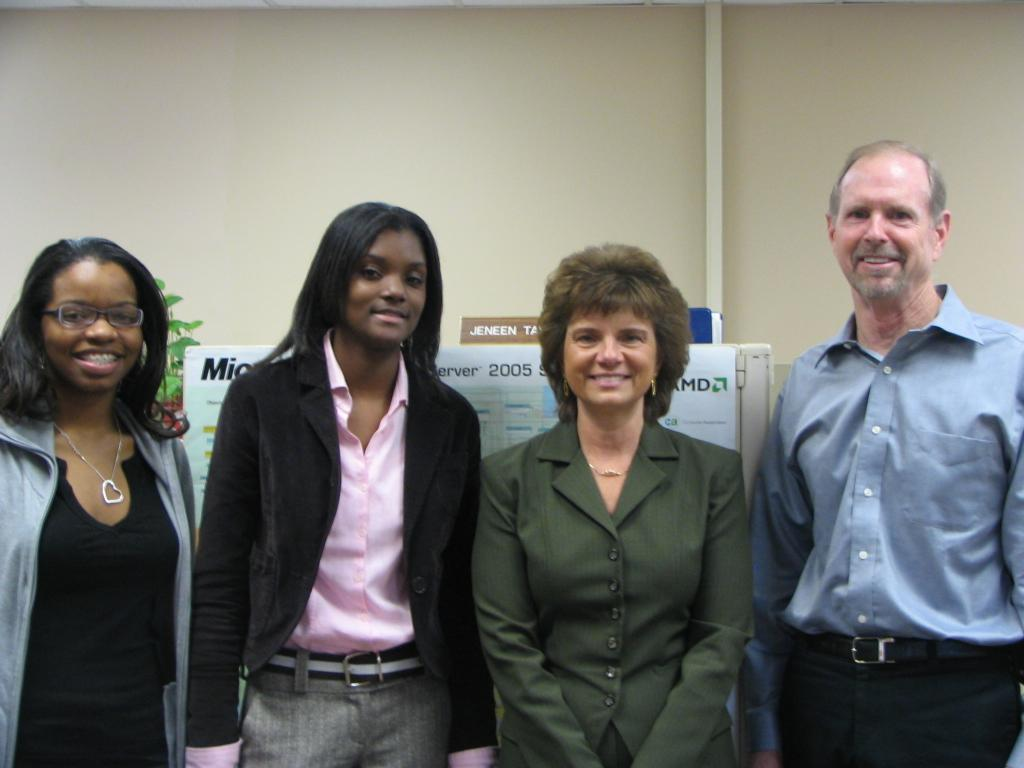
Edgewood High School students participating in job shadowing at Harford Mutual Insurance Company

== Students ==
The graph below shows student enrollment at Edgewood, and its general climb since 1993:

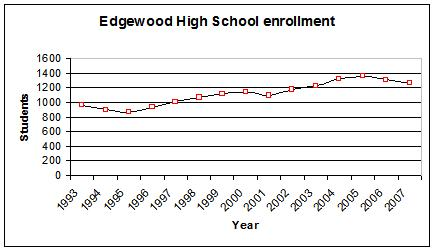

Edgewood's attendance rate of over 90% is rated "high", according to the Maryland State Department of Education's report card for the school. However, the graduation rate is approximately 75%, which the faculty is working diligently to improve. About 9% of the students receive special services, a number considered high by state standards. Larissa Santos was recognized at 2014 Maryland High School Principal of the Year until she was placed on Administrative Leave by Harford County Public Schools in July 2016 while under investigation. Ms. Santos resigned in July 2016 shortly after being placed on Administrative Leave and was replaced by Mr. Kilo Mack. Harford County Public Schools refused to comment on the investigation of Ms. Santos and her placement on Administrative Leave or if criminal activity was involved.

== Feeder system ==
Edgewood High School is fed by one middle school within the district. In turn, Edgewood Middle School is fed by students from 6 elementary schools:

- Abingdon Elementary
- Edgewood Elementary
- Paca/Old Post Elementary
- Deerfield Elementary
- William S James Elementary
- Riverside Elementary

Of these schools, all students from Abingdon Elementary School and Deerfield Elementary School will attend Edgewood High School, provided that they do not exercise a boundary exception, move, or transfer to a magnet program. In addition, 71% of the students from Edgewood Elementary School, 95% of the students from William Paca/Old Post Road Elementary School, and 30% of the students from William S. James Elementary School are districted to Edgewood High School. Also, approximately 1% of the students from neighboring Magnolia Elementary School will come to Edgewood, but the vast majority of students in that school attend Joppatowne High School.

== Athletics ==
Edgewood makes a variety of teams available to its students. Among the sports offered are baseball, softball, football, and basketball, as well as field hockey, lacrosse, soccer, golf, volleyball, tennis, and swimming. Edgewood also sponsors cheerleading, wrestling, indoor and outdoor track, and cross country teams. Edgewood's mascot is the Ram.

== Notable alumni ==
- Deonte Banks – football player
- Charles Bradley – NBA player
- Dudley Bradley – NBA player
- Richard Chizmar – author and publisher
- David Drake (actor) – actor
- Dale Midkiff – actor
- Chris Robinson – film and video director
- Johnathon Schaech – actor

== References and notes ==
- See also List of Schools in Harford County, Maryland
