= Aberdeen High School (Maryland) =

Location
- 251 Paradise Road; Aberdeen, Harford County, Maryland 21001; United States; 39.5159023°N 76.1701119°W

Information
- Type: Public
- Established: 1907
- School district: Harford County Public Schools
- NCES District ID: 2400390
- CEEB code: 210000
- NCES School ID: 240039000679
- Principal: Micheal Quigg
- Staff: 97.83 (on an FTE basis)
- Grades: 9–12
- Enrollment: 1,465 (2023–24)
- Student to teacher ratio: 14.97
- Colors: Blue and gold
- Mascot: Eagle
- Website: abhs.hcpsschools.org
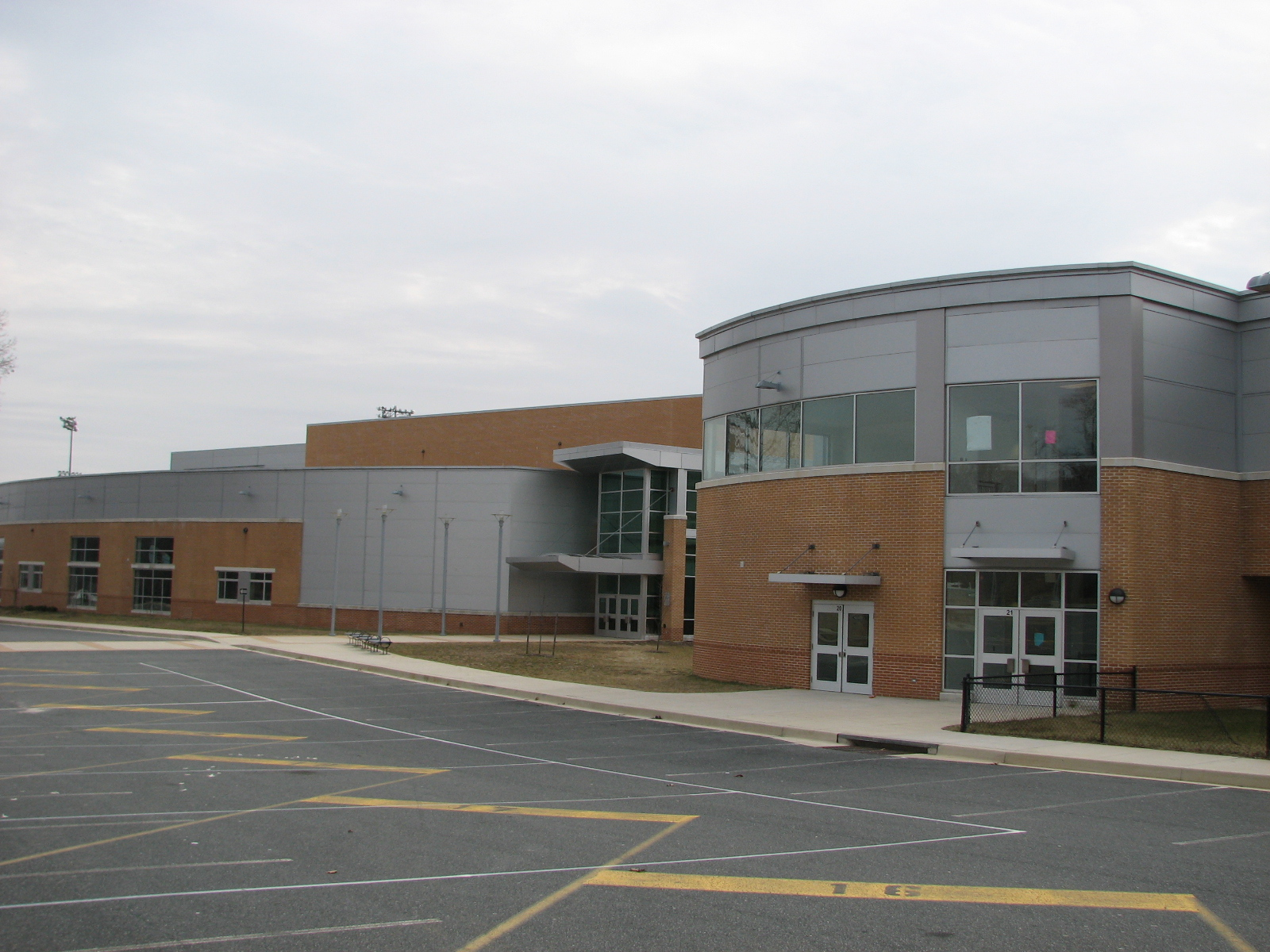
- Side view of Aberdeen High School, including main entrance

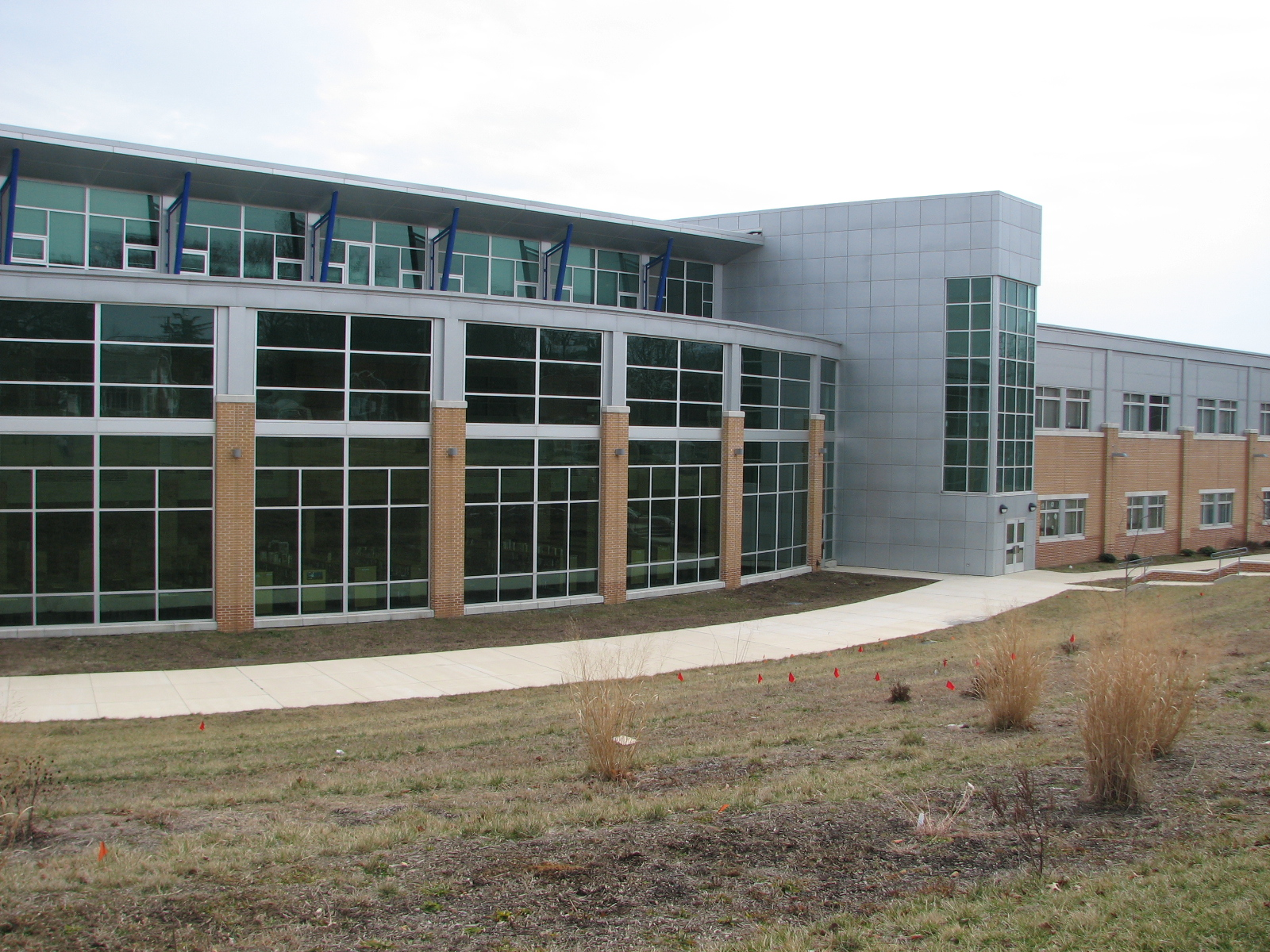
- Front view of Aberdeen High School, exterior of library

Aberdeen High School is a public high school in Aberdeen, Maryland, United States. It is a part of the Harford County Public Schools. As of 2025, according to the U.S. News & World Report, it ranks as the third best high school in Harford County Public Schools and the 108th in Maryland.

== Test performance ==
Aberdeen High School's performance on the Maryland High School Assessment test is close to equivalent to the state average. In algebra, the average proficiency was 3.1 out of five, the same as the average in the state. In English, the average proficiency was 2.9 out of five, while the state's average proficiency was 3.0.

== Science and Mathematics Academy ==
The Science and Mathematics Academy (SMA) is a magnet program located at Aberdeen High School in Aberdeen, Maryland available to Harford County residents entering high school. It was founded in 2004 by its first coordinator Donna Clem and in association with Dennis Kirkwood. The school is an active member of the National Consortium for Specialized Secondary Schools of Mathematics, Science and Technology and part of Harford County Public Schools.

=== School information ===
"The program provides students with opportunities to experience coursework in science, mathematics, and technology while emphasizing research applications. Regular communication with practicing scientists and mathematicians is a cornerstone of the program and seniors complete capstone projects. Throughout these projects they perform research under mentors who are professionals in their fields."

=== Classes and programs ===
Within the SMA schedule, many honors classes are integrated. AP classes are also strongly encouraged. Electives in the SMA add to the program's uniqueness. Electives are based on interest and may not be available every year.

The SMA has a unique class called Science Research and Technology (SRT) that SMA students are required to take each of four years at the SMA. The first three years of the SRT curriculum teach students about various academic fields and prepare them for their fourth and final year of SRT, in which they complete capstone projects. Students are paired with professionals in their fields of choice to mentor them for their projects. Seniors have two one-and-a-half-hour-long periods every other school day to complete their projects, which they present at the end of the year. They make posters to present their projects to the students, teachers, family, and professionals that come to the gallery walk that is held near the end of the school year. Throughout the process they have to perform research, write papers, and present their projects multiple times. All qualified Aberdeen High students can take part in the SMA Electives listed in the previous paragraph, but only SMA students can take SRT.

== Clubs and organizations ==
- Academic Team
- Asian Culture Association
- Black Student Union
- Chess club
- Envirothon
- FIRST Robotics Competition – Team 1980
- French National Honor Society
- Genders and Sexualities Alliance
- German Club
- Green Team
- International Thespian Society
- Latino Dancers
- Leo Club
- Marquee Drama Club
- Mu Alpha Theta
- National Honor Society
- Science National Honor Society
- Spanish Club
- Spanish National Honor Society
- Speech and Debate Club
- Students Against Destructive Decisions
- Tri-M Music Honor Society
- Ultimate Frisbee
- Future Educators Association
- Student Government Association
- HCRASC Membership School
- Aberdeen Eagles Esports
- Key Club
- Women in STEM Club

== Notable alumni ==
- Frank Eugene Corder (did not graduate), flew plane into south lawn of White House
- J. Wilmer Cronin (1896–1982), state politician and publisher of The Harford Democrat
- Dondre Gilliam, NFL wide receiver for the San Diego Chargers
- David Grace (basketball) UCLA and Oregon State University basketball coach.
- Michael D. Griffin, physicist, former Administrator of NASA
- E. J. Henderson, NFL linebacker for the Minnesota Vikings
- Erin Henderson, NFL linebacker for the New York Jets
- Brionna Jones, professional basketball player
- Stephanie Jones, professional basketball player
- Barbara Osborn Kreamer, Maryland politician
- Jai Lewis, professional basketball player
- Jon Harlan Livezey (born 1938), Maryland delegate
- Gary Neal, professional basketball player
- Irv Pankey, NFL lineman for the Los Angeles Rams and Indianapolis Colts
- Julie Peterson, model, Playboy Playmate of the Month (February 1987)
- Billy Ripken, former Baltimore Orioles second baseman
- Cal Ripken Jr., former Baltimore Orioles shortstop, Major League Baseball Hall of Fame member
- Cal Ripken, Sr., former Major League Baseball coach for the Baltimore Orioles
- Devon Saddler, professional basketball player in Italy, Greece, Hungary, Belarus and Israel
