= E. J. Henderson =

American football player (born 1980)

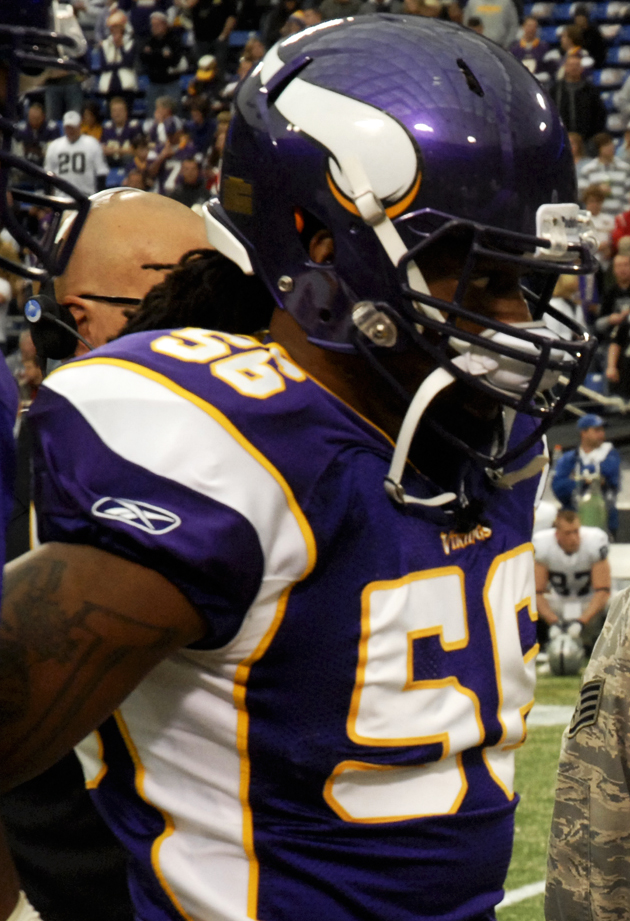
- Henderson with the Minnesota Vikings in 2011

No. 56
- Position: Linebacker

Personal information
- Born: August 3, 1980 (age 46); Fort Campbell, Kentucky, U.S.
- Listed height: 6 ft 1 in (1.85 m)
- Listed weight: 245 lb (111 kg)

Career information
- High school: Aberdeen (Aberdeen, Maryland)
- College: Maryland (1998–2002)
- NFL draft: 2003: 2nd round, 40th overall pick

Career history
- Minnesota Vikings (2003–2011)

Awards and highlights
- Pro Bowl (2010); Jack Lambert Trophy (2002); 2× Consensus All-American (2001, 2002); ACC Player of the Year (2001); 2× ACC Defensive Player of the Year (2001, 2002); First-team All-ACC (2001, 2002)

Career NFL statistics
- Total tackles: 752
- Sacks: 15.5
- Forced fumbles: 12
- Fumble recoveries: 9
- Interceptions: 5
- Defensive touchdowns: 1
- Stats at Pro Football Reference
- College Football Hall of Fame

Eric N. "E. J." Henderson (born August 3, 1980) is an American former professional football player who was a linebacker for nine seasons with the Minnesota Vikings of the National Football League (NFL). He played college football for the Maryland Terrapins, twice earning consensus All-American honors. He was selected by the Vikings in the second round of the 2003 NFL draft.

== Early life ==
Henderson was born in Fort Campbell, Kentucky. He attended Aberdeen High School in Aberdeen, Maryland, where he played high school football for the Aberdeen Eagles.

== College career ==
Henderson accepted an athletic scholarship to attend the University of Maryland, where he played for the Maryland Terrapins football team from 1999 to 2002. He holds three NCAA records: career total tackles per game (12.5), season unassisted tackles with 135 in 2002, and career unassisted tackles per game (8.8). He was recognized twice as a first-team ACC selection (2001, 2002), twice as the ACC Defensive Player of the Year (2001, 2002), and twice as a consensus first-team All-American (2000, 2001). As a junior in 2001, he was honored as the ACC Player of the Year. As a senior in 2002, he was the recipient of the Chuck Bednarik Award and Butkus Award, recognizing him as the best college defensive player and best college linebacker, respectively, in America. He was also selected as the defensive most valuable player in the Terrapins' 30–3 victory over the Tennessee Volunteers in the 2002 Chick-fil-A Peach Bowl.

== Professional career ==
Pre-draft measurables
Height	Weight	Arm length	Hand span	Bench press
6 ft 0 7/8 in (1.85 m)	245 lb (111 kg)	32 3/4 in (0.83 m)	10 in (0.25 m)	20 reps
All values from NFL Combine

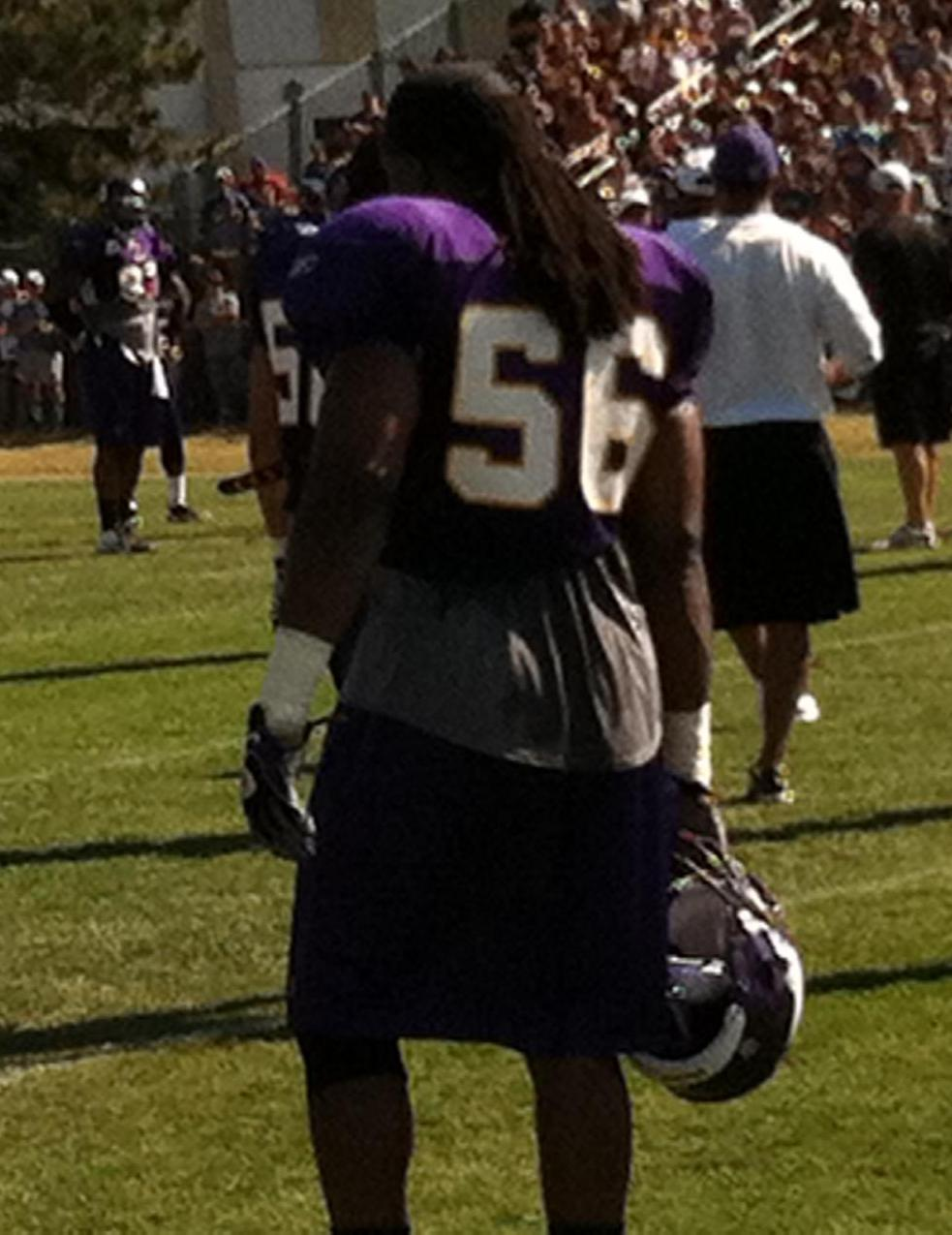
Henderson at Vikings training camp in 2011

On December 15, 2006, Henderson agreed to a five-year contract extension with the Vikings. The deal was reportedly worth over $25 million with $10 million guaranteed.

In April 2008, the Vikings signed Henderson's younger brother, Erin, as an undrafted free agent out of Maryland.

Henderson was placed on season-ending injured reserve after he dislocated multiple toes on October 6, 2008, in a game against the Tennessee Titans.

In Week 13 of the 2009 season, Henderson suffered a broken left femur during a game against the Arizona Cardinals. The injury occurred when his leg twisted violently as he was trying to tackle Tim Hightower and hit Jamarca Sanford's helmet. He was removed from the field on a motorized cart, accompanied by his younger brother and teammate Erin. Henderson stayed overnight in Phoenix for surgery, and missed the rest of the season. He made a full recovery in time for 2010 training camp. After what was described as a "remarkable recovery", Henderson was selected for the 2011 Pro Bowl.

=== NFL statistics ===
Season	Team	Defense							
Season	Team	GP	TOT	SOLO	AST	PD	SACK	FF	INT
2003	Min	16	32	27	5	0	0.0	1	0
2004	Min	14	93	65	28	3	1.0	1	0
2005	Min	15	75	53	22	1	1.0	1	0
2006	Min	16	110	77	33	2	3.0	1	2
2007	Min	16	118	94	24	4	4.5	3	0
2008	Min	4	27	23	4	0	1.0	1	0
2009	Min	12	83	63	20	1	2.0	0	0
2010	Min	16	105	71	34	4	1.0	1	3
2011	Min	16	107	78	29	3	2.0	3	0
	Total	125	749	550	199	18	15.5	12	5

== Personal life ==
He is the older brother of fellow former Vikings linebacker Erin Henderson, who also played college football for the Maryland Terrapins.
