= Jay Witasick =

American baseball player (born 1972)

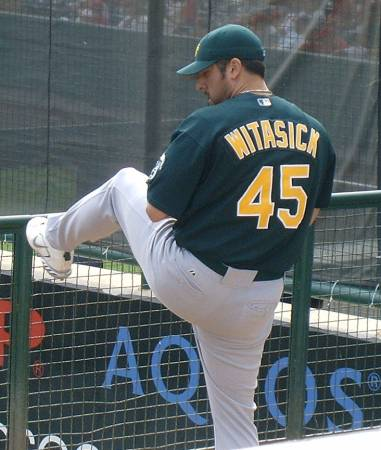
- Pitcher
- Born: August 28, 1972 (age 53); Baltimore, Maryland, U.S.
- Batted: Right Threw: Right

MLB debut
- July 7, 1996, for the Oakland Athletics

Last MLB appearance
- September 26, 2007, for the Tampa Bay Devil Rays

MLB statistics
- Win–loss record: 32–41
- Earned run average: 4.64
- Strikeouts: 645
- Stats at Baseball Reference

Teams
- Oakland Athletics (1996–1998); Kansas City Royals (1999–2000); San Diego Padres (2000–2001); New York Yankees (2001); San Francisco Giants (2002); San Diego Padres (2003–2004); Colorado Rockies (2005); Oakland Athletics (2005–2007); Tampa Bay Devil Rays (2007)

Gerald Alphonse "Jay" Witasick Jr. (/wɪˈtɑːsɪk/; born August 28, 1972) is an American former professional baseball pitcher. He pitched all or parts of 12 seasons in Major League Baseball (MLB) from 1996 to 2007, primarily as a relief pitcher.

== High school and college ==
Witasick attended C. Milton Wright High School (Bel Air, Maryland) and Brevard Community College (Melbourne, Florida) and the University of Maryland, Baltimore County. He also played in the Maryland Semi-Professional Baseball League All-Star Game in 1991.

== Professional career ==
Witasick was drafted by the St. Louis Cardinals in the 2nd round of the 1993 Major League Baseball draft. He made his MLB debut on July 7, 1996 as a member of the Oakland Athletics against the California Angels. In 1997 and 1998, he spent time with the Athletics in spring training. In his first three seasons with Oakland, he made a combined 27 appearances.

In 1999, Witasick was traded to the Kansas City Royals for a player to be named, Scott Chiasson, and was mainly used as a starter. In 32 appearances, 28 starts, Witasick was 9–12 with a 5.57 ERA in 158 1/3 innings. He struck out 102 and walked 83 batters. He began the following season with the Royals before being traded to the San Diego Padres for Brian Meadows. Overall between the two teams, Witasick was 6–10 with a 5.82 ERA in 150 innings. In 2001, he was converted into a reliever full time, and was traded midseason by the Padres to the New York Yankees for D'Angelo Jiménez. In a career high 63 appearances between both teams, he was 8–2 with 106 strikeouts in 79 innings. During the 2001 World Series, he appeared in one game, Game 6, in which he tied Grover Cleveland Alexander for the most earned runs allowed in a game in the Fall Classic—8 ER, in just 1 1/3 innings. In December 2001, he was traded to the San Francisco Giants for John Vander Wal. In 44 appearances for the Giants, he was 0–1 with a 2.37 ERA. In 68 1/3 innings, he struck out 54. In December 2002, he signed a two-year deal to return to the San Diego Padres.

He missed most of the 2003 season with a strained tendon in his elbow, appearing in only 46 games. He was 3–7 with a 4.53 ERA. In his second season, he rebounded with a 3.21 ERA in 44 games. He was a free agent after the season and signed a one-year deal with the Colorado Rockies. In 32 games with the Rockies, he was 0–4 with a 2.52 ERA before being traded to the Oakland A's in a deal that sent Eric Byrnes to the Rockies. After the deal, he was 1–1 in 27 2/3 innings. After the 2005 season ended, Witasick signed a two-year contract to remain with the Athletics.

He spent the majority of the 2006 season on the disabled list with a left ankle injury. On June 2, 2007, Witasick was designated for assignment by the A's and released on June 7. On June 12, he was signed to a one-year deal by the Tampa Bay Devil Rays. On October 25, 2007, the Devil Rays released him, ending his professional playing career.

== Post-playing career ==
Witasick joined the Harford Community College baseball team as an assistant coach for the 2008 season. He remained with Hart ford as pitching coach through at least the 2011 season. While coaching, Witasick also worked for TWC Sports Management, and later became a sports agent and represented Terrance Gore.
