= Bel Air Middle School =

Location
- 99 Idlewild Street; Bel Air, Maryland 21014; United States
- Coordinates: 39°31′39″N 76°20′40″W

Information
- Other name: BAMS
- Type: Public middle school
- School district: Harford County Public Schools
- NCES School ID: 240039001397
- Principal: Laura R. Silk
- Teaching staff: 76.94 (on an FTE basis)
- Grades: 6–8
- Enrollment: 1,324 (2016-2017)
- Student to teacher ratio: 17.21
- Colors: Blue and Black
- Mascot: Panther
- Website: bams.hcpsschools.org

Bel Air Middle School (BAMS) is a public middle school in Bel Air, Maryland, United States. It is part of the Harford County Public Schools district.

== Awards and recognition ==
During the 1999–2000 school year, Bel Air Middle School was recognized with the Blue Ribbon School Award of Excellence by the United States Department of Education, the highest award an American school can receive.

The school has been recognized by the Maryland State Department of Education for its long-term participation and success in the American Alliance for Health, Physical Education, Recreation and Dance's Hoops for Heart program, in which it has raised more than $200,000 during the past decade, the second-most in the country during that period. In 2006 alone, the school raised $35,037 the second-highest of all schools nationwide. The $29,509 raised for the program in 2005 also ranked the school second nationally. In 2006, Bel Air was one of over 25,000 schools across the country participated in the AAHPERD's basketball and jump rope fundraising programs.
