= Harford Day School =

Private school in Bel Air, Maryland, US

Location
- Bel Air, MD; USA
- Coordinates: 39°32′58″N 76°20′48″W

Information
- Type: Private, Co-ed, Day
- Established: 1957
- Principal: Susan Bond Kearney
- Campus: 12 acres (49,000 m^{2})
- Colors: Blue and Green
- Mascot: Dragons
- Team name: Harford Day School Dragons
- Website: www.harfordday.org

Harford Day School is an independent educational institution in Bel Air, Harford County, Maryland. It is accredited by the Association of Independent Maryland and DC Schools and a member of the National Association of Independent Schools.

== History ==
The school was founded in 1957 by a group of parents, including Sara Brumfield and Mignon Cameron. The school initially occupied a rented building on Hays Street in Bel Air before moving to its current location on Moores Mill Road in 1962.

== Organization ==
Harford Day School enrolls boys and girls from 3 year olds through eighth grade on a 12-acre (49,000 m^{2}) campus in Bel Air. The campus comprises a Lower School building with an attached gymnasium and library, which also houses the school's administrative offices, a Middle School building, a 12,600-square-foot (1,170 m^{2}) wing that includes a multi-purpose room and 2 science labs, an Early Childhood building, two playgrounds, three athletic fields, and a small wooded area beside Moores Mill Road.

The school is divided into three divisions: Early Childhood (Little Dragons - K), Lower School (1-5) and Middle School (6-8).

As of the 2023-2024 school year, the Head of School is Mrs. Susan Kearney. The division heads are currently:

- Middle School (Grades 6-8): Mr. Devin Wootton
- Lower School (Grades 1 to 5): Mrs. Ashleigh Wilkes
- Early Childhood (Little Dragons - K): Mrs. Molly Levis

The school teaches Science, Mathematics, History, English grammar and literature, along with two foreign languages. Students are introduced to Spanish in pre-kindergarten, and all students take Spanish classes through the sixth grade. In seventh grade, students then decide whether to continue with Spanish, or take Chinese. A Latin class is also offered to students in the eighth grade.

== Spring musical ==
One of the largest events in Harford Day's Middle School is the annual spring musical. The musical became a yearly event in 2000 after a generous contribution to the program by the family of Lyn Stacie Getz '81. An award for outstanding achievement in the performing arts is given in Lyn Stacie Getz's name to an eighth grader at the end of each school year. Each year, the musical has been as follows:

- 1995 - The Wizard of Oz
- 1996 - Oliver!
- 2000 - Annie
- 2001 - The Wizard of Oz
- 2002 - The Music Man
- 2003 - Guys and Dolls
- 2004 - Bye Bye Birdie
- 2005 - The Sound of Music
- 2006 - Aladdin
- 2007 - Once Upon a Mattress
- 2008 - Fiddler on the Roof
- 2009 - The King and I
- 2010 - Beauty and the Beast
- 2011 - Oklahoma!
- 2012 - Annie
- 2013 - The Little Mermaid
- 2014 - Peter Pan
- 2015 - Crazy For You
- 2016 - Bye Bye Birdie
- 2017 - The Sound of Music
- 2018 - Once Upon a Mattress
- 2019 - Into the Woods
- 2021 - The Little Mermaid Jr.
- 2022 - Xanadu Jr.
- 2023 - Legally Blonde Jr.
