= Harford County Public Schools =

Public school system in Maryland, United States

Location
- 102 S. Hickory Avenue, Bel Air, Maryland Harford County, Maryland United States

District information
- Type: County-wide public school system
- Grades: Pre-Kindergarten through 12th
- President: Lauren Paige
- Superintendent: Dyann R. Mack
- Budget: $653,282,774 (FY2024, Operating Expense) $175,604,540 (FY2024, Capital & Other Expenses)

Students and staff
- Students: 37,771 (2024–25)
- Teachers: 2,653.61 (on an FTE basis)
- Athletic conference: Upper Chesapeake Bay; Athletic Conference

Other information
- Website: www.hcps.org

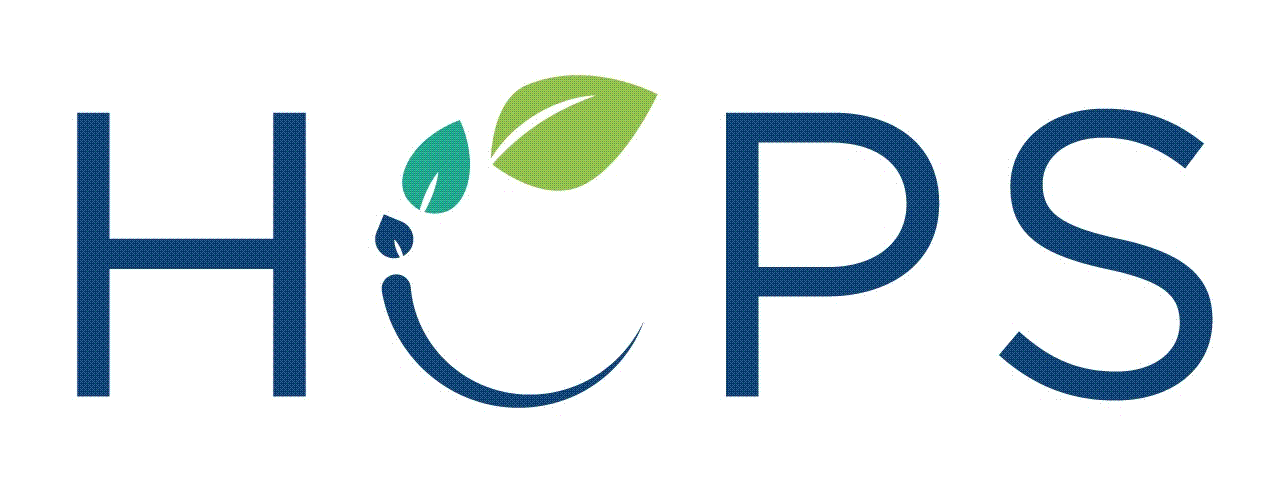
Latest Harford County Public Schools (HCPS) Logo

Location of Harford County within Maryland

Location of Maryland with the United States

Harford County Public Schools (HCPS) is the public school district serving all of Harford County, Maryland. As the eighth-largest school system in the state, HCPS educates approximately 38,000 students across 55 schools, supported by 5,645 dedicated employees and 2,142 classrooms.

HCPS is led by Superintendent Dyann R. Mack, who has served in the role since 2026. HCPS is managed by the Board of Education (BOE) of Harford County, which is an independent and distinct state agency from HCPS and the Harford County Government. The BOE consists of 6 elected members, 3 appointed, and 1 elected student. The BOE is led by Lauren Paige, President, and Wade A. Sewell as Vice President.

As of 2024, HCPS is ranked 9th in Maryland for academic performance, and in Niche's 2025 rankings, it holds the 3rd position for both "Best School Districts for Athletes" and "Districts with the Best Teachers," and is ranked 5th for "Best Places to Teach in Maryland.

Harford County Public Schools operates within the same geographic boundaries as Harford County itself.

== Schools ==
=== Elementary schools ===
There are thirty-three (pre K–5th) elementary schools in Harford County. Homestead-Wakefield and Old Post Road Elementary schools are two-building campuses housing primary students (Kindergarten-2nd Grade) in one building and intermediate students (3rd Grade-5th Grade) in the other building. Homestead-Wakefield Elementary school is in the process of being rebuilt as a single-building campus. Youth's Benefit Elementary school was formerly a two-building campus, but was rebuilt as a single-building campus in 2014.

- Abingdon Elementary School, Abingdon
- Bakerfield Elementary School, Aberdeen
- Bel Air Elementary School, Bel Air
- Church Creek Elementary School, Belcamp
- Churchville Elementary School, Churchville
- Darlington Elementary School, Darlington
- Deerfield Elementary School, Edgewood
- Dublin Elementary School, Street
- Edgewood Elementary School, Edgewood
- Emmorton Elementary School, Bel Air
- Forest Hill Elementary School, Forest Hill
- Forest Lakes Elementary School, Forest Hill
- Fountain Green Elementary School, Bel Air
- George D. Lisby Elementary School at Hillsdale, Aberdeen
- Hall's Cross Roads Elementary School, Aberdeen
- Havre de Grace Elementary School, Havre de Grace
- Hickory Elementary School, Bel Air
- Homestead/Wakefield Elementary School, Bel Air
- Jarrettsville Elementary School, Jarrettsville
- Joppatowne Elementary School, Joppa
- Magnolia Elementary School, Joppa
- Meadowvale Elementary School, Havre de Grace
- Norrisville Elementary School, White Hall
- North Bend Elementary School, Jarrettsville
- North Harford Elementary School, Pylesville
- Old Post Road Elementary School, Abingdon
- Prospect Mill Elementary School, Bel Air
- Red Pump Elementary School, Bel Air
- Ring Factory Elementary School, Bel Air
- Riverside Elementary School, Joppa
- Roye-Williams Elementary School, Havre de Grace
- William S. James Elementary School, Abingdon
- Youth's Benefit Elementary School, Fallston

=== Middle schools ===
There are 9 (grade 6–8) middle schools in Harford County:

- Aberdeen Middle School, Aberdeen
- Bel Air Middle School, Bel Air
- Edgewood Middle School, Edgewood
- Fallston Middle School, Fallston
- Havre de Grace Middle School, Havre de Grace
- Magnolia Middle School, Joppa
- North Harford Middle School, Pylesville
- Patterson Mill Middle and High School, Bel Air
- Southampton Middle School, Bel Air

=== High schools ===
There are currently ten (grades 9–12) high schools in Harford County, including one technical high school.

- Aberdeen High School, Aberdeen
- Bel Air High School, Bel Air
- C. Milton Wright High School, Bel Air
- Edgewood High School, Edgewood
- Fallston High School, Fallston
- Harford Technical High School, Bel Air
- Havre de Grace High School, Havre de Grace
- Joppatowne High School, Joppatowne
- North Harford High School, Pylesville
- Patterson Mill Middle and High School, Bel Air

High School Advanced Placement Scores 2015

High School	High School Enrollment	AP Exams	AP Exams 3+	AP Exams 3+ %
Aberdeen	1444	658	488	74.2%
Bel Air	1668	550	318	57.8%
C. Milton Wright	1425	564	430	76.2%
Edgewood	1318	189	65	32.80%
Fallston	1076	589	360	61.1%
Harford Tech	1022	230	90	39.0%
Havre de Grace	581	245	85	34.7%
Joppatowne	696	139	41	29.5%
North Harford	1297	402	270	67.2%
Patterson Mill	871	314	203	64.6%

==== Magnet programs ====
Three HCPS high schools also have or are preparing for magnet programs. Although the Science and Mathematics Academy is a separate institution, it is hosted by and shares some facilities with Aberdeen High School, and Harford Technical High School is in itself a magnet school for academic and technical programs. Edgewood High School is in the beginning stages of the International Baccalaureate Diploma Programme, in which the school will offer college-preparatory courses for its students, who will graduate with an internationally recognized high school diploma. .

- Harford Technical High School:
  - Nursing
  - Sports Medicine
  - Printing & Graphic Communications
  - Automotive
  - Heating, Ventilation and Air Conditioning (HVAC)
  - Cyber Security
  - Computer-Aided Machinery (CAM)
  - Computer-Aided Design (CAD)
  - Electrical
  - Horticulture
  - Carpentry
  - Culinary
  - Welding
  - Cosmetology
  - Teacher Academy of Maryland (TAM)
- Joppatowne High School:
  - Pathways in Technology Early College High School (P-Tech)
  - Junior Reserve Officers Training Corps (JROTC)
- Aberdeen High School (Maryland)|Aberdeen High School
  - Science and Math Academy (SMA)
- Havre de Grace High School
  - Information Technology Oracle Academy (ITOA)
- North Harford High School
  - Large Animal Science
  - Small Animal Science
  - Plant Science
  - Natural Resource Science
- Edgewood High School
  - International Baccalaureate (IB)
  - Teacher Academy of Maryland (TAM)

==== Mascots ====
The school mascots are:

- Aberdeen Eagles
- Bel Air Bobcats
- C. Milton Wright Mustangs
- Edgewood Rams
- Fallston Cougars
- Harford Technical Cobras
- Havre de Grace Warriors
- Joppatowne Mariners
- North Harford Hawks
- Patterson Mill Huskies
- Magnolia Vikings

=== Alternative/charter schools ===
- Harford Academy, Bel Air, grades K–12
- Swan Creek School, Aberdeen, grades K–12

== School feeder systems ==
The images below outline the elementary and middle schools that feed students into each high school. Harford Technical is fed by students from each school, as entry is by application. The feeder system is not all-inclusive, due to magnet programs at Aberdeen, Edgewood, and Joppatowne.

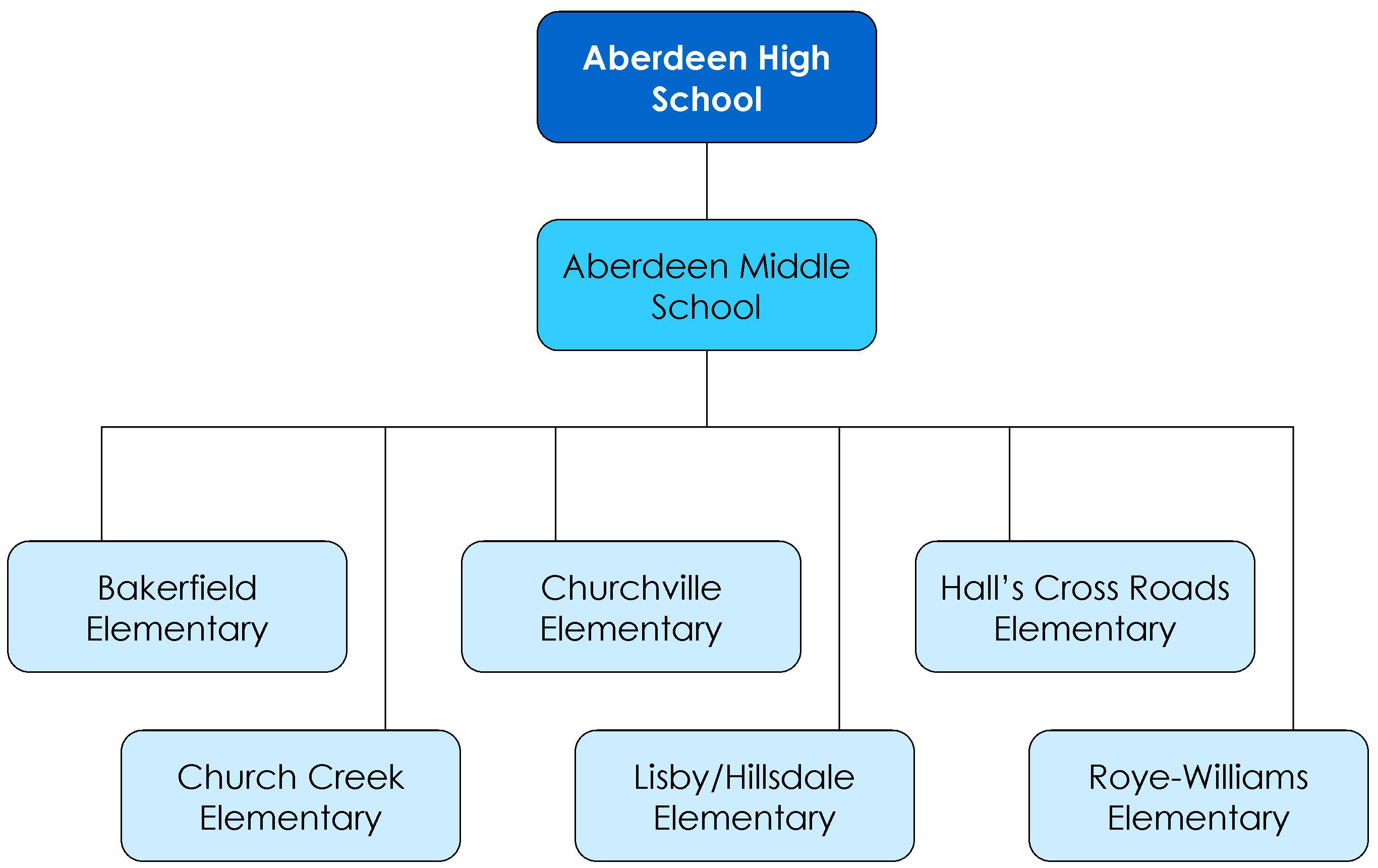
Aberdeen

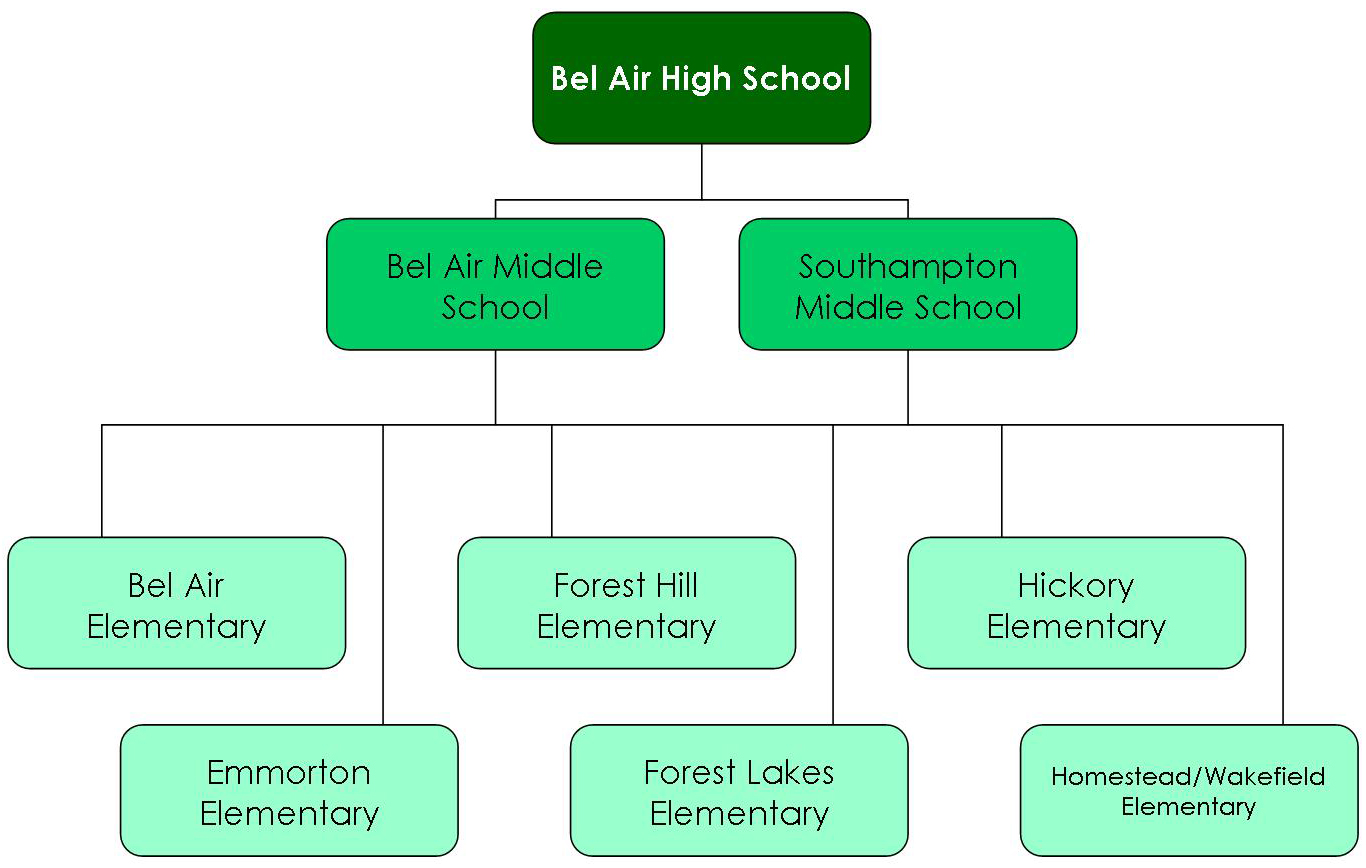
Bel Air

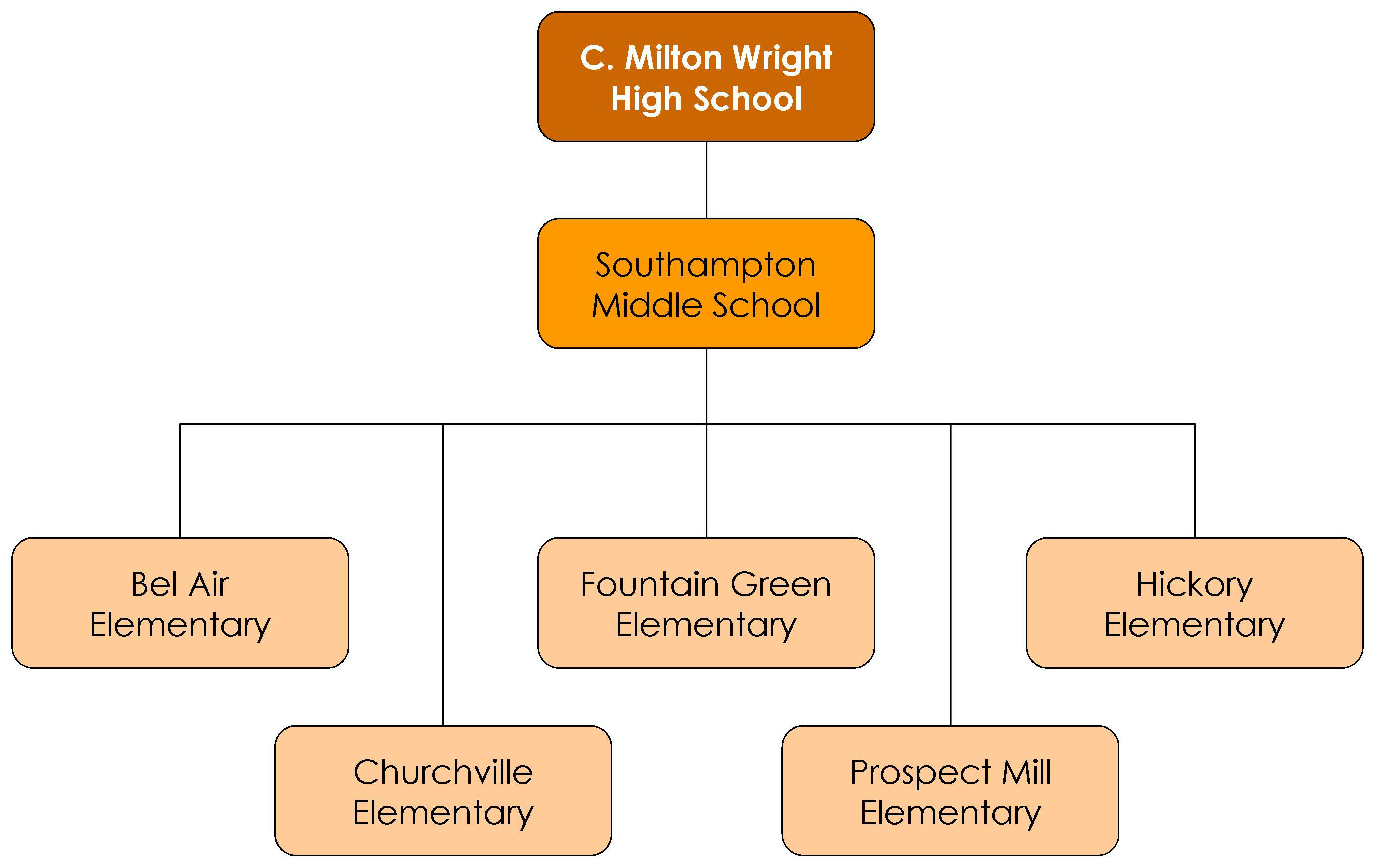
C. Milton Wright

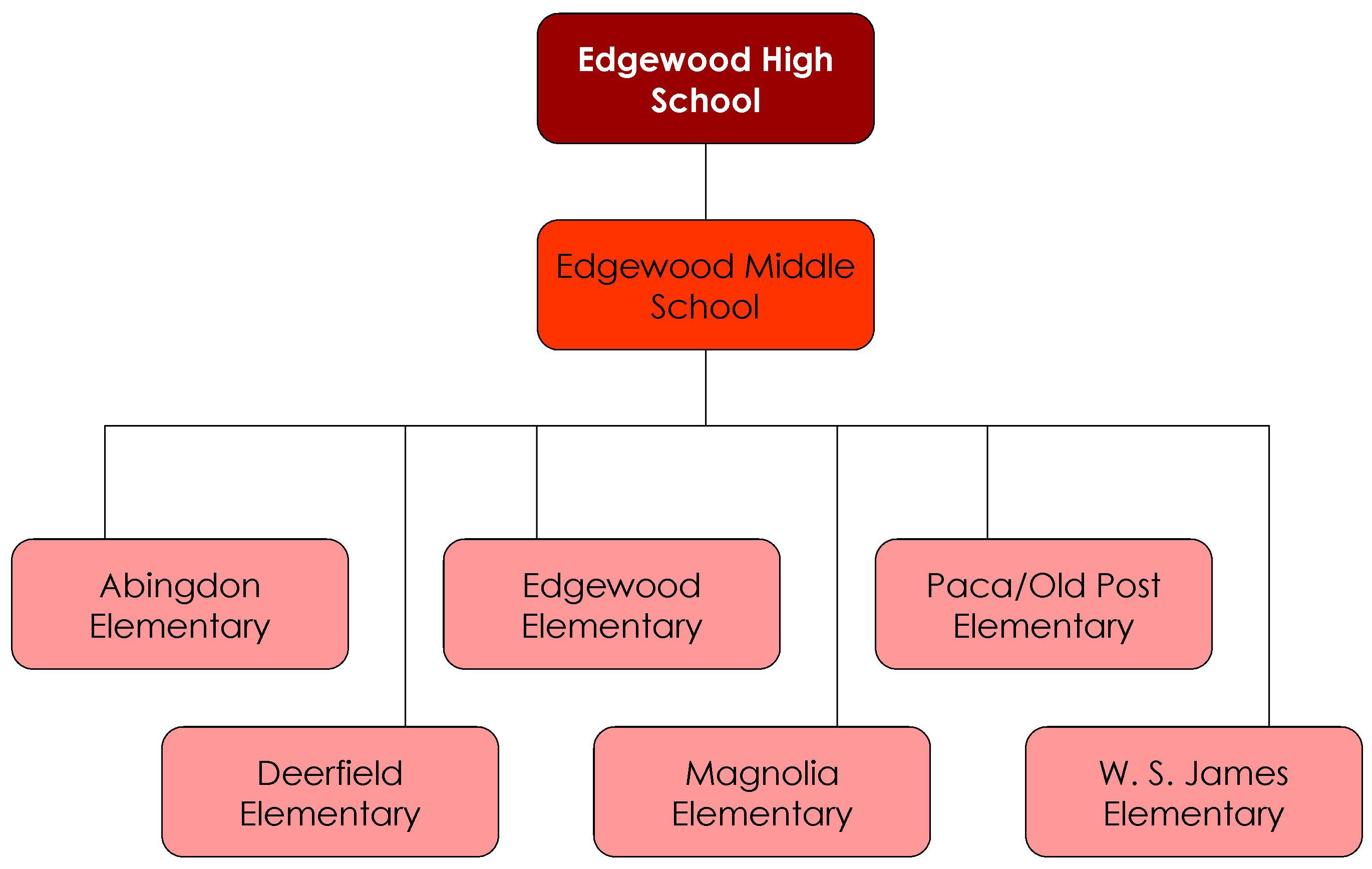
Edgewood

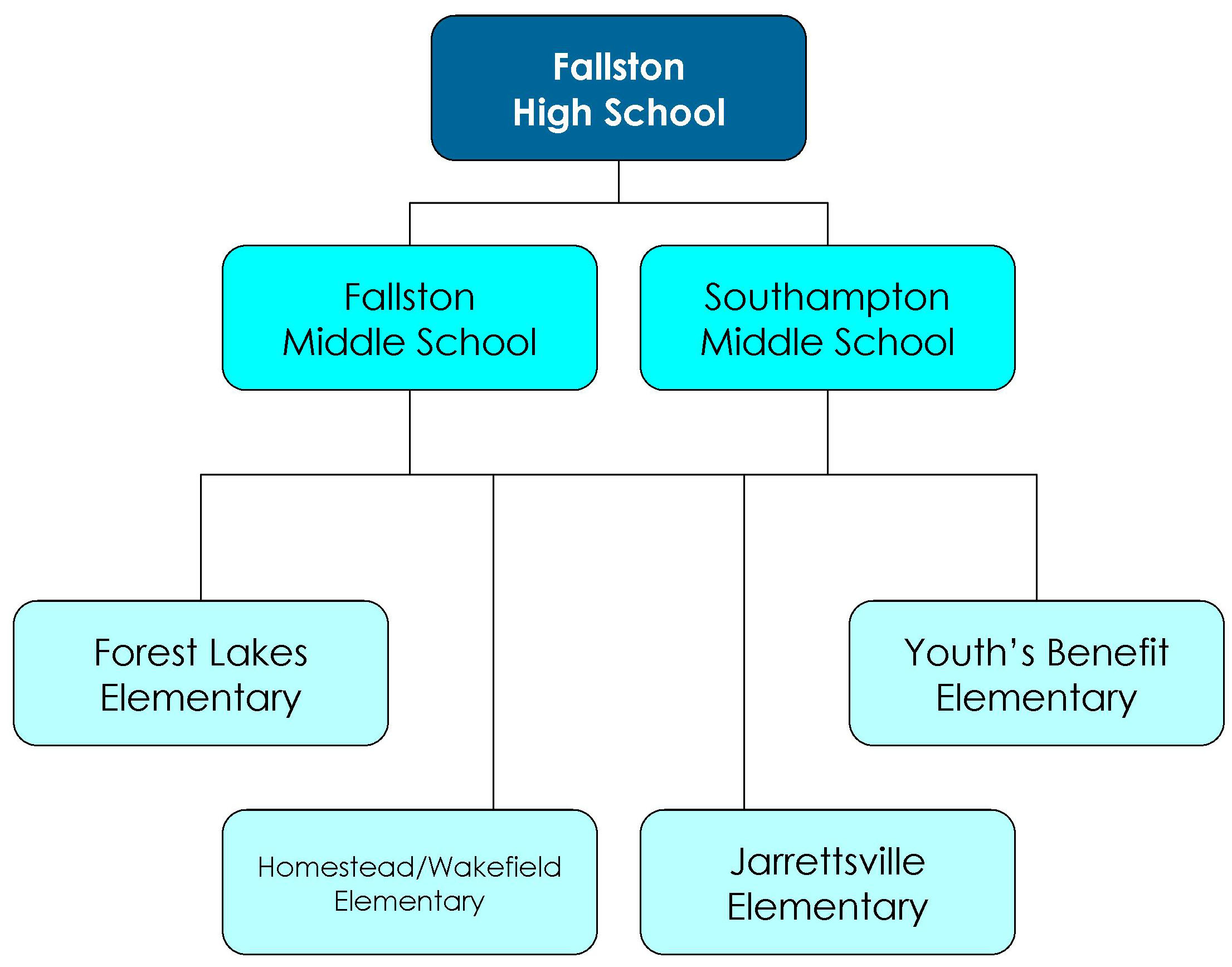
Fallston

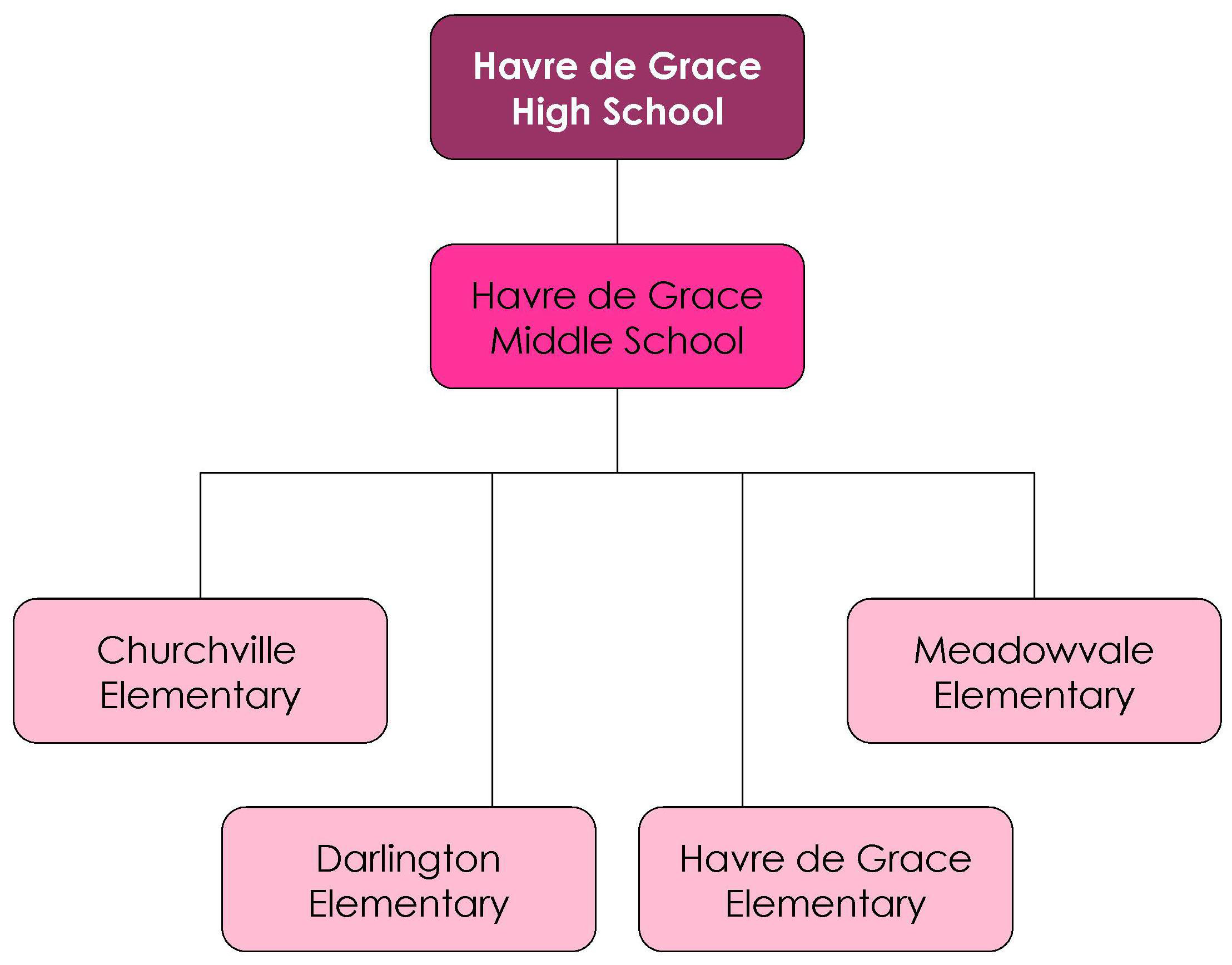
Havre de Grace

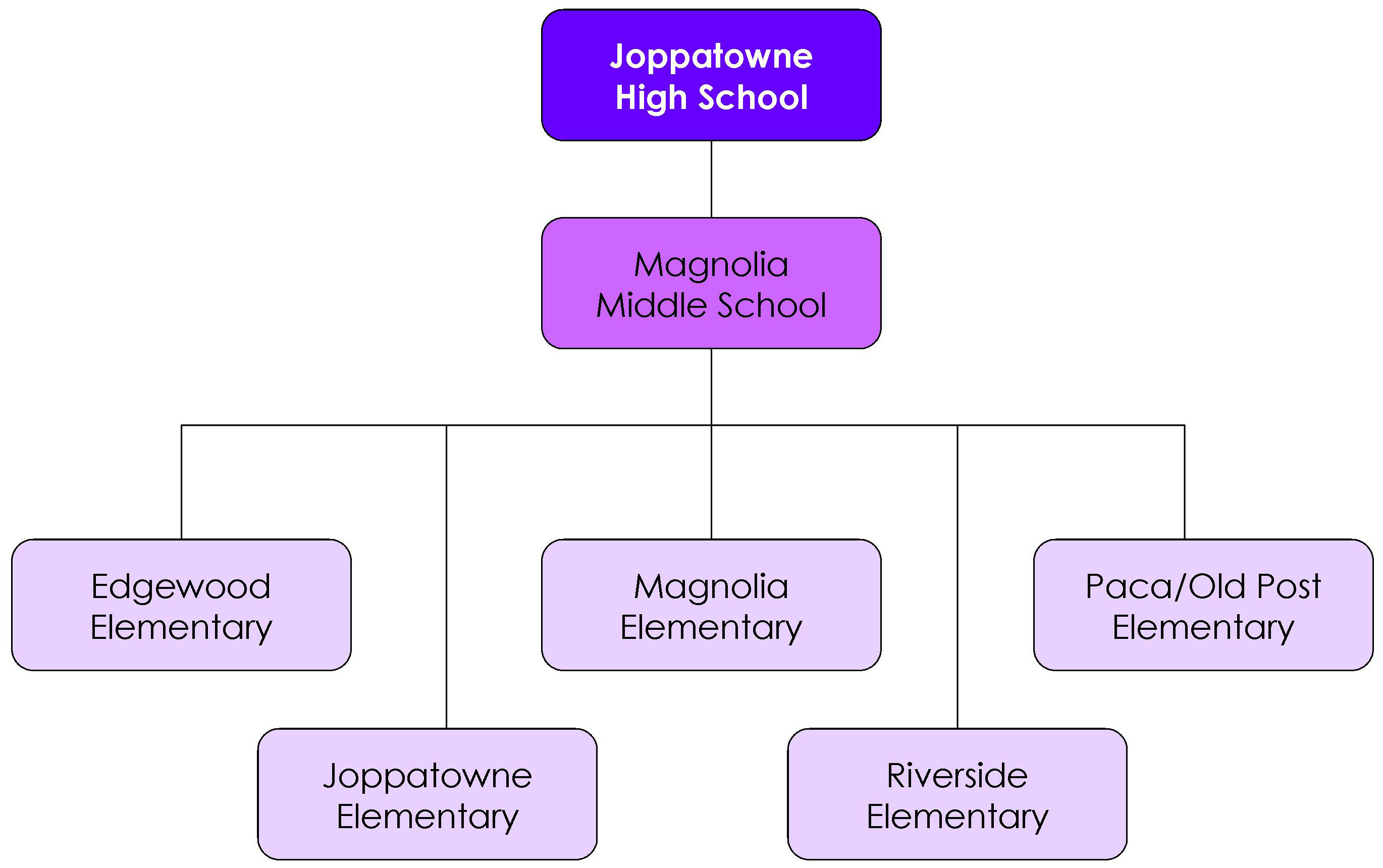
Joppatowne

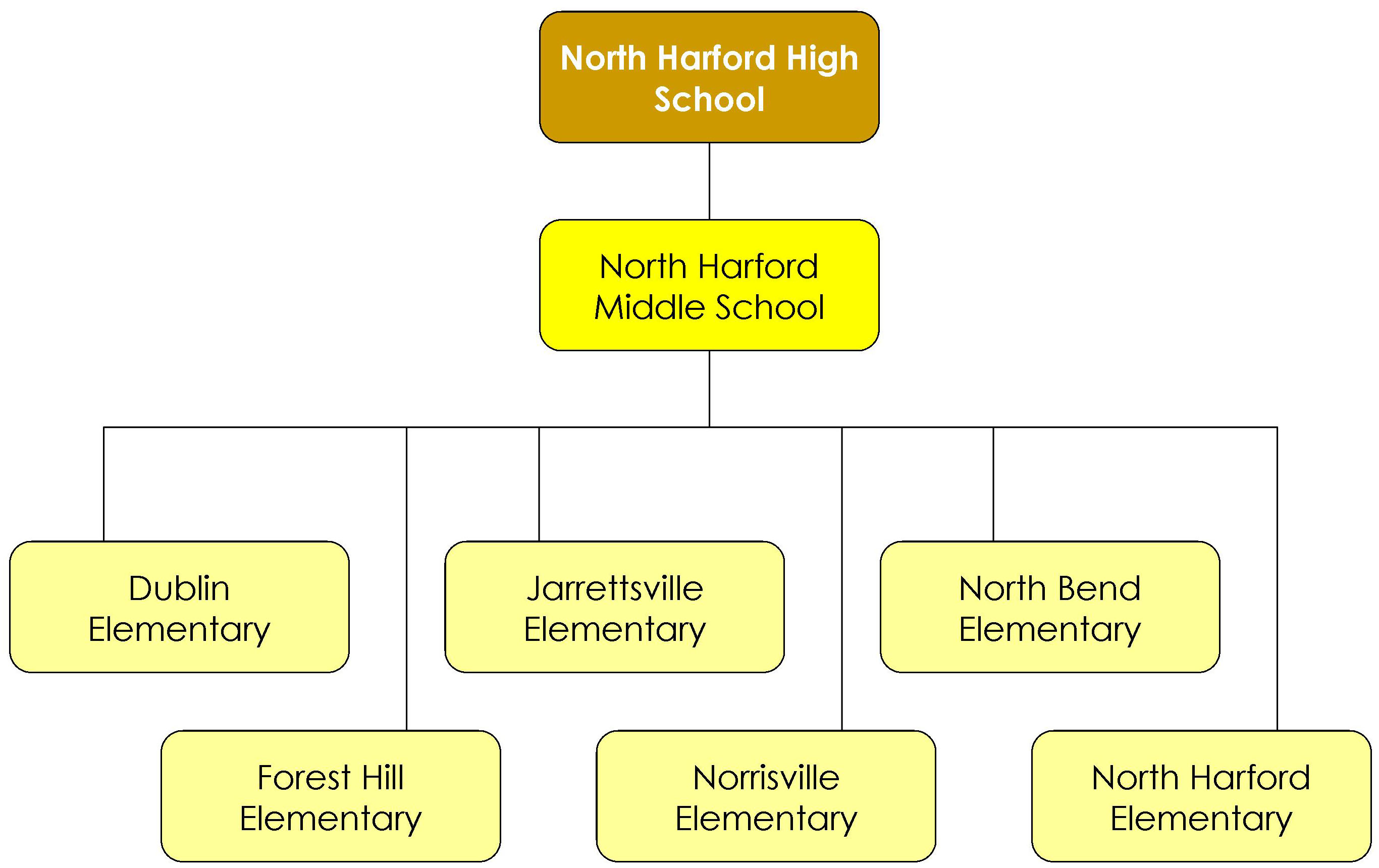
North Harford

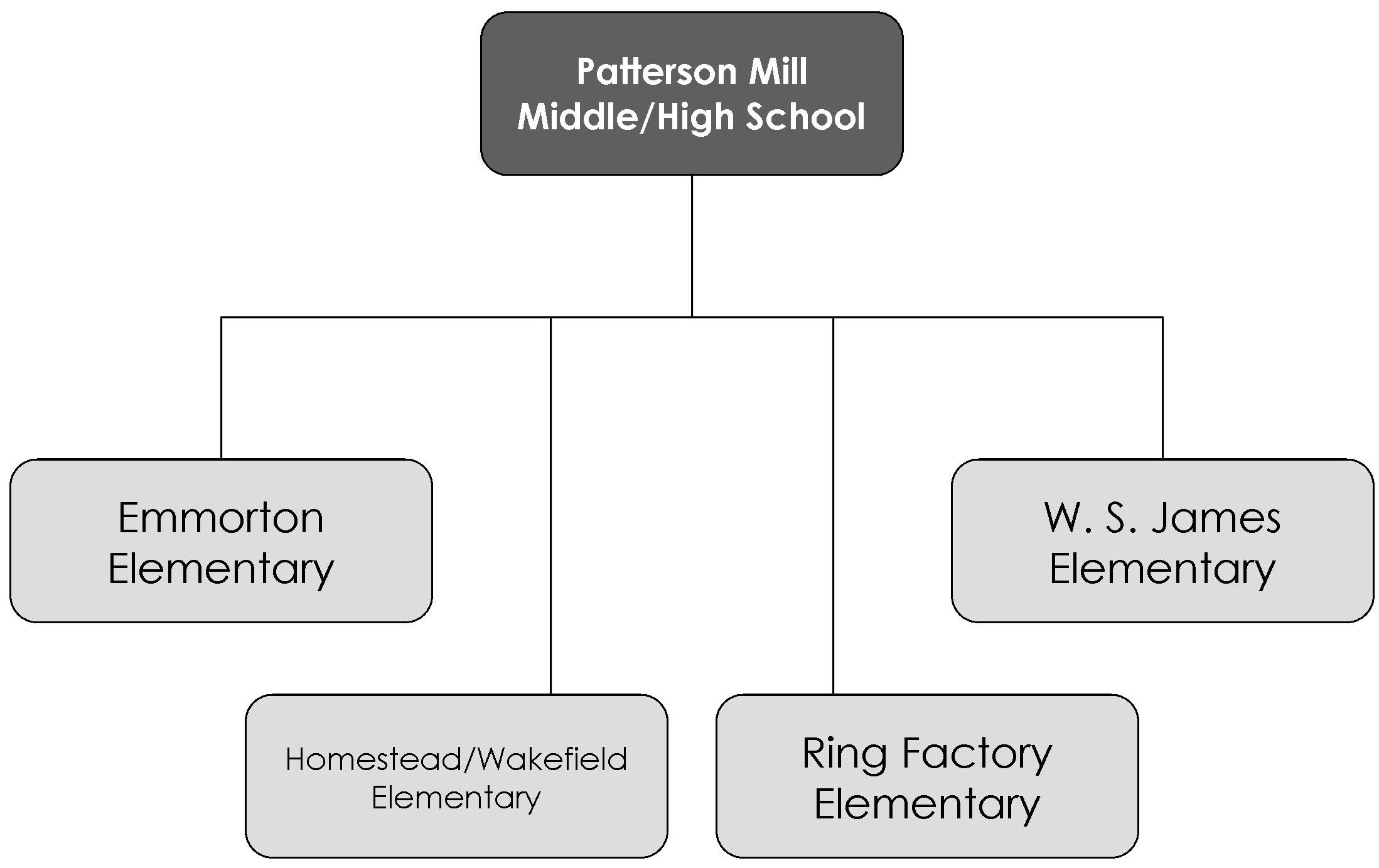
Patterson Mill

== Demographics ==
The district educates approximately 39,000 students, with a breakdown across elementary, middle, and high schools. Around 21,000 students are enrolled in elementary schools, 8,500 in middle schools, and 10,500 in high schools.

There is a total enrollment of 6,396 in AP courses, 1,737 students enrolled in a magnet program, and 856 students are dual enrolled. The graduation rate is about 89%.

The majority of students are White (~59%), followed by Black or African American students (~21%), Hispanic or Latino students (~9%), and smaller groups of Asian (~3%) and Mixed Race students (~7%). A small percentage of students (~1%) belong to other ethnicities. About 51% of students are male and 49% female.

HCPS also serves a significant number of English Language Learners (ELL), with about 5% of students receiving language support. Additionally, about 14% of students are enrolled in special education programs, and the district provides a variety of services to support students with disabilities. Around 39% of students qualify for free or reduced-price meals.

As for the teachers, the district has a diverse staff, though like many school systems, the majority of teachers are White (around 70%). There are also Black (15%), Hispanic (10%), and Asian (5%) teachers. Many of HCPS's teachers are highly experienced, with about 45-50% having 10 or more years of teaching experience.

== Teacher of the Year ==
The Harford County Public Schools Teacher of the Year award is an annual recognition honoring excellence in teaching within the HCPS district. The award celebrates educators who demonstrate outstanding dedication to student learning, innovation in the classroom, and leadership within the school community.

Teachers are nominated by peers, administrators, students, and families. Finalists are selected through an application and interview process conducted by a panel of educators and community members. The winner is formally announced each spring and honored at an annual banquet.

The recipient of the HCPS Teacher of the Year award becomes the county’s official nominee for the Maryland State Teacher of the Year competition, organized by the Maryland State Department of Education (MSDE).

=== List of winners ===
- 2025: Shelby Hultquist, Havre de Grace Elementary School (Special Education)
- 2024: Erica Richardson, Joppatowne High School (Social Studies)
- 2023: Michael Brogley, C. Milton Wright High School (Social Studies)
- 2022: Ashley Gereli, Churchville Elementary School (Special Education)
- 2021: Lauren Byrd, Hickory Elementary School (First Grade)
- 2020: Elizabeth White, Harford Technical High School (Social Studies)
- 2019: Paige Milanoski, Havre de Grace High School (English)
- 2018: Paula Stanton, Bel Air High School (English)
- 2017: Amy Mangold, John Archer School (Special Education)
- 2016: Sharalyn Heinly, North Harford Middle School (Mathematics)
- 2015: Laura Potter, C. Milton Wright High School (Mathematics)
- 2014: Lawrence M. Jehnert, Edgewood Elementary School (Third Grade)
- 2013: Kristin M. Schaub, Havre de Grace Elementary School (Fifth Grade)
- 2012: Christina D. O'Neill, Bel Air Middle School (Language Arts)
- 2011: Christian S. Slattery, Sr., Hall's Cross Roads Elementary (Vocal Music)
- 2010: Lisa C. Mullen, North Harford Middle School (Language Arts)
- 2009: Kimberly Schmidt, Havre de Grace High School (Social Studies)
- 2008: Ronald Wooden, George D. Lisby Elementary School at Hillsdale (Fifth Grade)
- 2007: Christine Roland, Edgewood High School (Biology/Forensic Science)
- 2006: Susan Healy, North Bend Elementary School (Fourth Grade)
- 2005: Lorna "Lori" Frendak, North Harford Middle School (Special Education)
- 2004: Joan M. Hayden, Bel Air High School (Family & Consumer Science)
- 2003: Donna M. Clem, Aberdeen High School (Biology/Physics)
- 2002: Howard E. Eakes, Fountain Green Elementary School (Fifth Grade)
- 2001: Alberta C. Porter, Riverside Elementary School (Third Grade)
- 2000: Donna M. Zavacky, Ring Factory Elementary School (Fifth Grade)
- 1999: Craig S. Harvey, Fallston High School (Music)
- 1998: Kurt W. Bittle, Bel Air High School (Visual Arts)
- 1997: James L. Mason, North Harford High School
- 1996: Cathy G. Cerveny, Ring Factory Elementary School (Fifth Grade)
- 1995: J. Patrick Whitehurst, Bel Air High School (Social Studies)
- 1994: Marybeth Ford, Bel Air High School (Language Arts)
- 1993: Victor Petrosino, C. Milton Wright High School
- 1992: Martha "Marty" Banghart, North Harford High School (Music)
- 1991: Gemma Hoskins, Magnolia Middle School (Fifth Grade)
- 1990: Donald R. Osman, Havre de Grace High School (English)
- 1989: Anthony F. Sarcone, Fallston High School (Social Studies)
- 1988: Robert Handy, Bel Air High School (Social Studies)
- 1987: Paul S. Schatz, Edgewood Elementary School
- 1977: Laurie K. Neeper, John Archer School (Music)

== See also ==
- Harford Glen Environmental Education Center
- Havre de Grace Colored School Museum and Cultural Center
