= Harford Friends School =

School in Harford County, Maryland, US

Friends School of Harford

Location
- Harford County, Maryland; USA
- 39°40′10″N 76°22′37″W

Information
- Motto: Learn, Live, Lead
- Established: 2005
- Closed: 2018 type = Private, Co-ed, Day
- Principal: Anna Dallam
- Grades: K-8
- Information: 443-640-6300
- Website: fshmd.org/index.php

Friends School of Harford is a co-ed K–8 independent private school guided by Quaker values located in Harford County, Maryland and was under the direction of Head of School, Jonathan Huxtable.

Founded in 2005, it originated as a middle school located in the Deer Creek Friends Meeting House in Darlington, Maryland. The school moved in 2008 to The Highlands Commons Building in Street, Maryland, near Bel Air, Maryland. In 2009, the school expanded to include grades one through five. Expansion continued in the summer of 2010 with the addition of a new science lab. In 2012, Friends School of Harford welcomed a new Head of School, Clare Pitz. This change in administration coincided with the move to Friends School of Harford's location in Forest Hill, Maryland.

Friends School of Harford is the only Friends school in Harford County, Maryland and is a member of the Friends Council on Education. Consistent with Friends School of Harford's commitment to Quaker values the school periodically sponsors community seminars on parenting and conflict-resolution.

The school is supported by private donations, local Friends Meetings, equipment donations from local colleges and other private schools, as well as tuition. The school suspended operations for the 2018-2019 school year and is not accepting students.

== Curriculum ==
Academic subjects include science, mathematics, history, English, and Spanish. Specials include physical education, art, music, and numerous field trips. Extracurricular activities include Destination Imagination, Drama, Art, Lego, Athletics, Technology, and Student Government.

Experiential learning, service-learning, computer technology, library and media arts, conflict-resolution, creative problem solving, and study skills are focuses of program development and integration.

== Collaborative partnerships ==
Friends School of Harford has collaborative partnerships with the following organizations to ensure top quality instruction in art, music, fitness, and other programs of study:

- Genesee Valley Outdoor Learning Center
