= North Harford High School =

Location
- 211 Pylesville Road; Pylesville, Maryland 21132; United States; 39°40′31″N 76°24′21″W

Information
- Type: Public high school
- Motto: Hawk Yeah, Hawks on the warpath GO GO!
- Established: 1950; 76 years ago
- School district: Harford County Public Schools
- NCES School ID: 240039000710
- Principal: Michael Quigg
- Teaching staff: 74.25 FTE (2022-23)
- Grades: 9–12
- Gender: Co-educational
- Enrollment: 1,221 (2022-23)
- Student to teacher ratio: 16.44 (2022-23)
- Hours in school day: 7
- Campus: Rural
- Colors: Green and gold
- Slogan: Hawk Yeah!
- Fight song: Wilbury Twist
- Sports: Soccer, Football, Lacrosse, Women's Lacrosse, Tennis, Baseball, Field Hockey, Basketball, Women's Basketball, Soccer, Women's Soccer, Cross Country, Golf, Softball, Swimming, Track & Field, Volleyball, Women's Volleyball, Wrestling
- Mascot: Hawk (Talon McHawky-Face)
- Nickname: "Duck Farmers"
- Rival: Joppatowne High School
- Newspaper: Cry of the Hawk
- Yearbook: Aerie
- Website: nhhs.hcpsschools.org/o/nhhs

North Harford High School is a public high school located in Pylesville, Maryland, United States. It is part of the Harford County Public Schools system.

North Harford High School is one of the few schools in Harford County, Maryland to have an FFA Chapter, and the only school in Harford County to have a barn with a semi-working farm on campus. North Harford finished undergoing renovations and additions at the beginning of the 2008 school year. Its re-dedication ceremony was held on April 13, 2008, in the new auditorium.

The school's athletic teams compete as the North Harford Hawks. The school affectionately embraces what was supposed to be a derogatory nickname that had its roots in the 1960s. The northern part of Harford County was extremely rural compared to the rest of the county and the school grounds included a pond...that some ducks called home. No other county campuses had a pond. And North Harford students were mockingly referred to as 'Duck Farmers'. It led to many slogans on flags and buttons such as 'Duck Power' and 'Duck You'. Alum commonly refer to each other as Duck Farmers as a show of school pride.

== Student Government ==
North Harford's student government program is one of the most active in Harford County. Currently, North Harford's SGA is a member of both the Harford County Regional Association of Student Councils and the Maryland Association of Student Councils. North Harford is allotted nine votes in the Harford County Regional Association of Student Councils.

North Harford's SGA is made up of an executive board, individual Class Boards that report to the executive board, and forum representatives elected from every English class.

Events sponsored by the SGA include the Homecoming Dance, holiday food drives, Quarterly General Assemblies, Red Cross Blood Drives, an annual School Beautification Day, and HCRASC General Assemblies.

The Student Government Association is the primary vehicle of communication between the student body and the administration at North Harford High School. In addition to sponsoring events and acting as a liaison between the students and administration, the SGA allocates money to all clubs and organizations needing funds for the school year. Student organizations can apply for funds via the executive board president or treasurer. Some organizations receiving funds for the 2007–2008 school year include the Spirit Club, the Science Department, the Student of the Month Program, and several others.

== Major Clubs ==
=== Envirothon ===
In the 2009 competition, North Harford's B team placed 3rd among B teams and 7th overall. In 2010, North Harford's team won the presentation portion of the competition. The A-team placed 7th and the B-team placed 4th. In the 2015 5th topic presentation, North Harford won 1st place, beating the reigning 9-year champions, Harford Christian. Additionally, the A-team placed second and the B-team placed third.

=== Academic Team ===
The Academic Team competes yearly in several competitions, including on the CBS show “It’s Academic” against other local high schools and in the Harford County Academic Tournament, in which the team reached the finals in 2012.

=== NHHS Jazz Band ===
In past years, the band has performed for WJZ-13's "It's Academic" program. They have also played at the Lincoln-Regan Dinner. The Jazz Band has also played for the Harford County Public Library for the Christmas Holidays. They are well known for their rendition of "Mr Blue Sky" by the Electric Light Orchestra. Every once in while, the Jazz Band holds coffee houses right in the newly constructed band room.

== Natural Resources and Agricultural Science Magnet Program ==
The Natural Resources and Agricultural Sciences Magnet Program (NRAS)is located at North Harford High School.

The Natural Resources and Agricultural Sciences Magnet (NRAS) is composed of four clusters focusing on Small Animal Science, Large Animal / Equine Sciences, Plant Sciences, or Natural Resources Sciences. Programs provide students with the opportunity to experience challenging coursework and experience science and technology with emphasis on career development and real-world application. The Harford County Agricultural Economic Advisory Board, the University of Maryland, Harford Community College, and Harford County Public Schools have partnered to develop a program where each cluster will provide students with the quality background knowledge and skills necessary for continued education or to gain entry into their work-based field of choice.

Students will have the opportunity to earn college credits and various industry-level certifications while still in high school. All students will learn geospatial applications and may earn nationally recognized certification through NASA. In the senior year, students will take part in a capstone project. This will occur either in a work-based environment, a school-based practical learning activity, or an off-site research activity with a mentor. The capstone is based on the student's areas of interest and future goals.

== Athletics ==
=== Baseball ===
- 2026 ranked #54 in the state by MaxPreps
- 5x Regional Champions
- 2x State Runner-Ups
- 3x State Semifinalists

=== Football ===
- 2025 ranked #184 in the state
- 1985 Regional Champions
- Reaches State Semifinals in 1992 & 1994

Former NFL player Lewis Lorando "Randy" McMillan is a North Harford High School alum.

=== Softball ===
- Varsity 2005: Reached the regional championship game, where they suffered a loss against Easton High School.

=== Basketball ===
- Women's Varsity coach, Lin James, reached her 600th career game on December 10, 2012, in her 46th season. James was subsequently inducted into the school's athletic Hall of Fame.

=== Soccer ===
- 1985 – Harford County and regional champions. State semi-finalists. Ranked 12th in the State of Maryland.
- 1992, 1994 – State semi-finalists.

=== Boys Lacrosse ===
- 1990, 1995 Maryland State Champions. Head Coach John Grubb was subsequently inducted into the school's athletic Hall of Fame.

=== Hall of Fame 2017 Inaugural Induction Class ===
- Kathy Beresh(‘88), Sandy Steltz Burkett(‘65), Cory Donohoe(‘07), Suzanne Eyle (98’), Beth Goodwin(‘97), Jen Griffin(‘02), Rachel Scarborough(‘59), Wanda Troyer(‘71), Peggy Waddell(‘58), Lori Ziegler(‘82)
- Glenn Allen(‘83), Paul Glamp(‘75), Henry Gordon(‘76), Dave Hoeck(‘73), Randy McMillan(‘77), Tom Riley(‘70), Scott Sheppard(‘81), Keith Smith(‘95), Ed Snodgrass(‘70), Tim Tarbert(‘78)
- The entire 1962 Maryland State Champion Boys Basketball team: Greg Beattie(‘64), John Blaney(‘62), Bob Bonhage(‘62), Ron Cole(‘64), Dave DeRan(‘64), Clifford Hopkins(‘63), Mac Lloyd(‘62), Kirk Nevin(‘62), Dave Sanborn(‘62), Nick Whiteford(‘62) and Head Coach Robert Garbacik.
