= Joppatowne High School =

Public school in Joppatowne, Maryland, United States

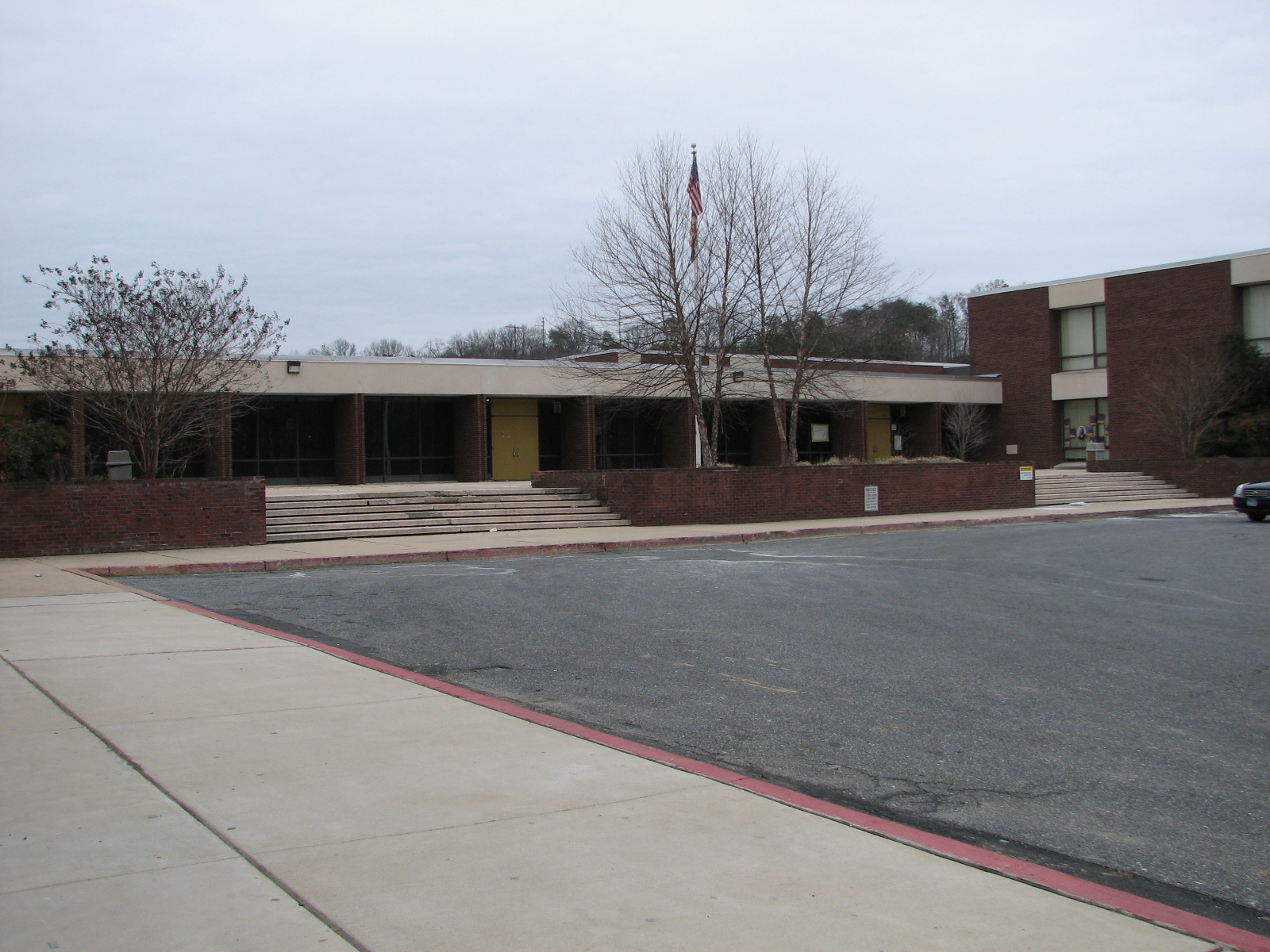
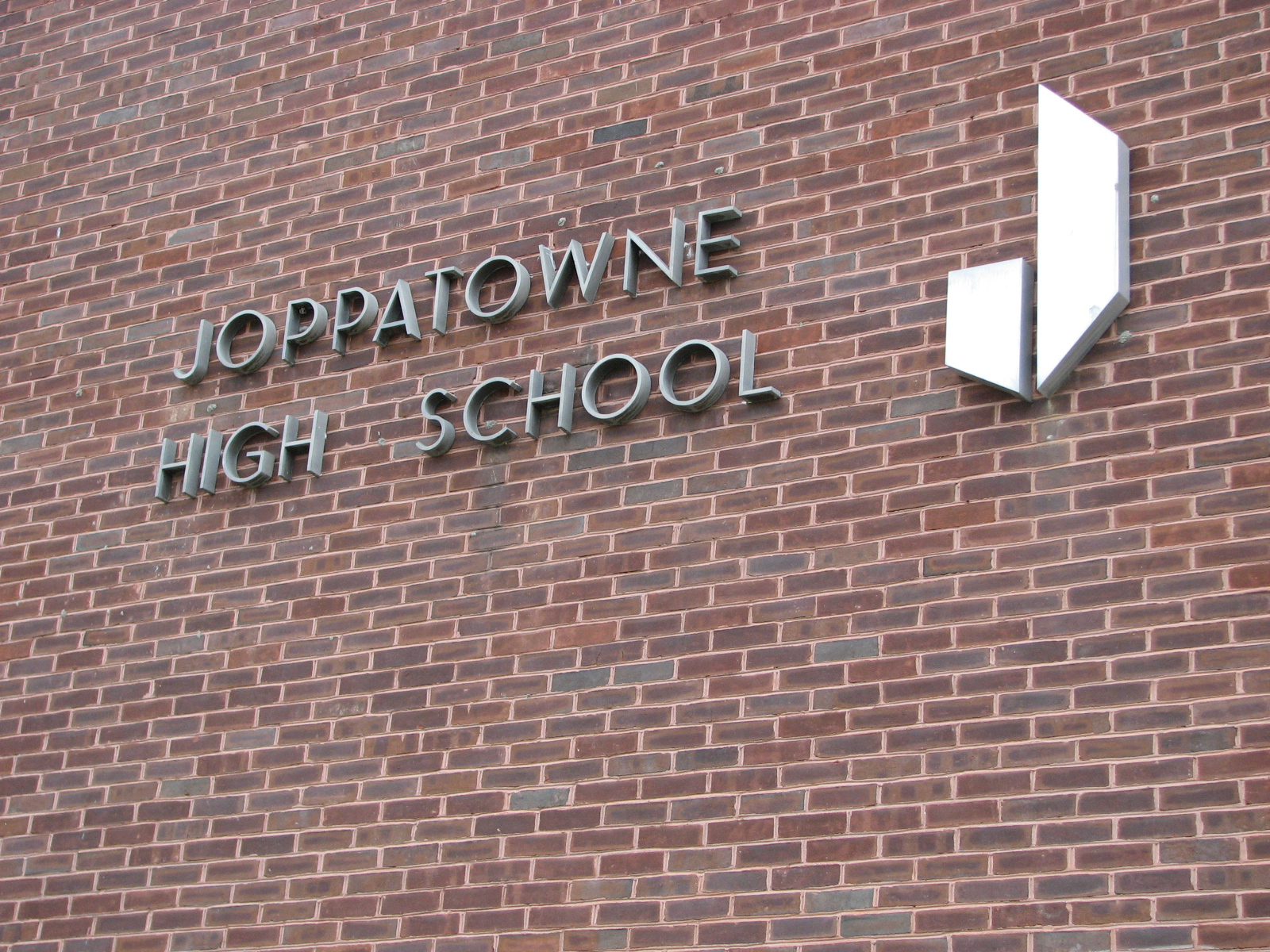
- Joppatowne's main entrances Logo on the exterior of Joppatowne High School

Location
- 555 Joppa Farm Rd. Joppatowne, (Harford County), Maryland; United States; 39°24′51″N 76°21′6″W

Information
- Type: Public, government funded
- Established: 1972
- School district: Harford County Public Schools
- Principal: Melissa K. Williams
- Grades: 9–12
- Enrollment: 666 (2015-16)
- Campus: Suburban
- Colors: Purple, white and silver
- Mascot: Mariner
- Rival: Edgewood
- Website: Joppatowne High School website

Joppatowne High School is a high school in Joppatowne, Harford County, Maryland, United States.

== History ==
Joppatowne High School was established in 1973.

=== Homeland Security program ===
In August 2007, Joppatowne became the first high school to specialize in teaching skills useful to the industries serving U.S. Homeland Security. Mother Jones magazine reported that, funded by government agencies as well as defense firms, students in the school's "Homeland Security and Emergency Preparedness magnet program will study cybersecurity and geospatial intelligence, respond to mock terror attacks, and receive limited security clearances at the nearby Army chemical warfare lab." The school is also expected to offer lessons in Arabic and other languages useful to current US homeland security interests. The graduating class of 2010 featured the Homeland Security program's first graduates.

=== 2024 shooting ===
Around 12:36 pm on September 6, 2024, a 16-year-old Joppatowne student named Jaylen Prince shot a 15-year-old classmate named Warren Grant during an altercation in a bathroom. The suspect fled the school and was caught shortly after in a nearby apartment complex, however no gun was found. The shooting was described as an "isolated incident". The victim was flown to a hospital with serious injuries, and died soon after arrival. The suspect will be tried as an adult.

== Location ==
Joppatowne High School is located on 555 Joppa Farm Road in Joppa, Maryland. The school is in the southwest corner of Harford County, just south of U.S. Route 40. The school borders the districts of Fallston High School and Edgewood High School.

== Sports ==
- Fall: American football, cheerleading, boys' and girls' soccer, field hockey, cross-country, golf, boys and girls volleyball
- Winter: Boys' and girls' basketball, cheerleading, swimming, wrestling
- Spring: Track and field, boys' and girls' lacrosse, tennis, baseball, softball

== Notable alumni ==
- Richard K. Impallaria, State Delegate.
- John R. Thomas, Jay Thomas, class of 1985, is a professor of law at Georgetown University.
- Wendy Davis, class of 1984, works as an actress in Hollywood. Her latest project is the Lifetime series Army Wives. She has also appeared in episodes of Grey's Anatomy, Cold Case, Coach and many other shows. She was a regular in the series The New WKRP in Cincinnati and High Incident.
- Thori Staples played on the US National women's soccer team.
- Jeremy Navarre, Former, defensive end for the Arizona Cardinals; former defensive end at the University of Maryland.
- Ron Stallings, class of 2001, Professional Mixed Martial Arts fighter, a Strikeforce veteran and current UFC fighter, Born and raised in Joppatowne Maryland, Attended and graduated from JHS, currently trains with Team Lloyd Irvin in Prince George's County and runs a school in Bel Air, MD
