= Science National Honor Society =

American academic science honor society

- Founded: 2000; 25 years ago Texas
- Type: Honor, high school
- Affiliation: Independent
- Status: Active
- Emphasis: Science
- Scope: National (United States)
- Chapters: 1,071
- Headquarters: 15901 Amis Court; Austin, Texas 78734; United States
- Website: www.sciencenhs.org

Science National Honor Society is an American academic nationwide honor society focused on science for high school students.

== History ==
Science National Honor Society was established in 2000 in Texas to recognize and promote outstanding coursework in the sciences by high school students. It also cultivates the next generation scientific researchers and explorers in the United States.

The society is run by teachers, scientists, and business people who volunteer their time. The IRS recognized the society as a nonprofit organization on October 5, 2021. The society's headquarters is Austin, Texas.

== Activities ==
Members participate in a service project and attend guest lectures. Chapters either host or judge a science fair or a science club or help tutor other students in their school. In addition to recognizing students, the society also presents the SNHS Student Scholarships annually.

== Chapters ==
As of 2023, the Science National Honor Society has 1071 active chapters across the United States.

== Membership ==
Membership is open to students in their sophomore, junior, or senior year of high school who have taken at least two honors science classes. Potential members must have a cumulative B+ average or a 3.5-grade point average in their science classes.
