= Springbrook High School =

Coordinates: 39°3′29.31″N 77°0′19.49″W

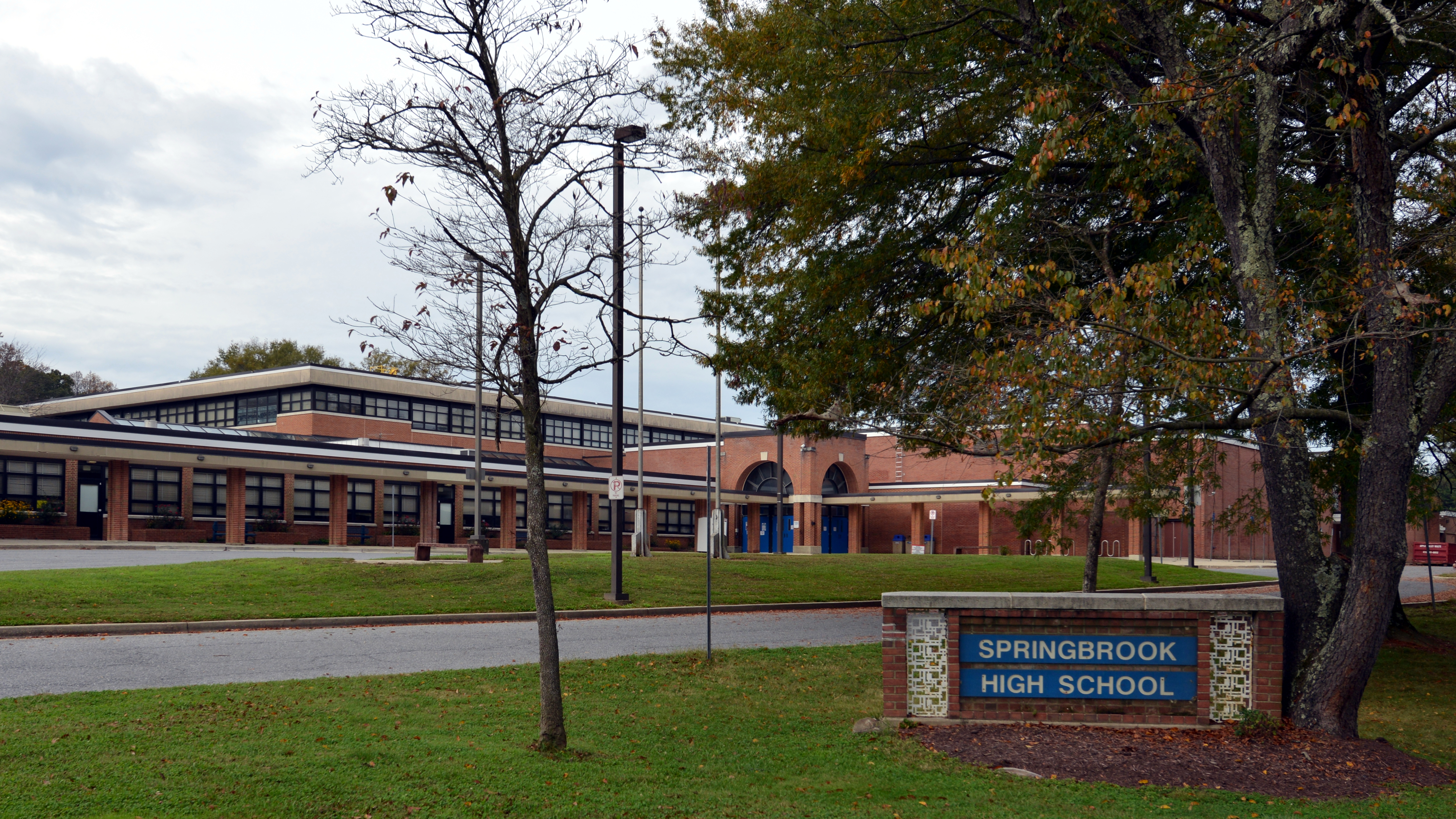

Location
- 201 Valley Brook Drive; Silver Spring, Maryland 20904; United States

Information
- Type: Public secondary
- Motto: "The Springbrook Experience"
- Established: 1960
- Oversight: Montgomery County Public Schools
- Principal: Aaron K. Shin
- Grades: 9–12
- Enrollment: 1,838
- Colors: Columbia Blue and Navy Blue
- Mascot: Blue Devil
- Nickname: The Brook
- Rivals: Paint Branch High School; James Hubert Blake High School; Sherwood High School
- Yearbook: Trident
- Website: Springbrook Website

Springbrook High School is an American public high school, located in Montgomery County, Maryland, in the Washington, D.C. metropolitan area. It is located within the White Oak census-designated place, and has a Silver Spring mailing address. It is between the Colesville and White Oak communities.

Springbrook is a member of Montgomery County's Northeast Consortium, composed of Springbrook, James Hubert Blake and Paint Branch high schools, allowing students from the communities of Ashton, Burnt Mills, Burtonsville, Calverton, Cloverly, Colesville, Fairland, Spencerville, southern Olney, Hillandale, and White Oak to choose between the three schools.

Springbrook was constructed in 1960 and named after the upper Northwest Branch spring-fed tributary that runs next to its property. The school was renovated in the early 1990s and reopened in 1994.

As of 2024, the school holds 1,838 students. The total minority enrollment is 95%.

== Rankings ==
As of 2024, U.S. News & World Report ranks Springbrook 1792 out of 17,656 U.S. high schools, and 33 out of 255 Maryland high schools. The ranking is based on six factors relating to performance on state assessments and preparedness for college. Springbrook is ranked 12th out of the 29 high schools of Montgomery County Public Schools.

Springbrook draws its students from Montgomery County's Northeast Consortium, a population also served by two other public high schools, Blake and Paint Branch, which U.S. News & World Report ranks 74 and 57 respectively (out of Maryland high schools).

As of 2024, the graduation rate is 82%, which is somewhat below the state median.

== Academic programs ==
The International Baccalaureate (IB) curriculum is a program offering at Springbrook. It includes the Middle Years Program, featuring a Personal Project, for 9th and 10th graders, and the IB Diploma Program for 11th and 12th graders. In addition, Springbrook offers an Advanced Placement (AP) program. Students may start taking AP courses as early as their freshman year with AP U.S. History. As of 2024, The AP participation rate at Springbrook is 74%. Springbrook is one of the 25 Maryland high schools that sends the most students to the University of Maryland's Clark School of Engineering, the only NEC high school included in that list.

Another Springbrook program is the Academy of Information Technology (AOIT). AOIT is a four-year program which is offered to students interested in computer programming, web development, the aesthetics of designing for the web, basic engineering, microcomputer technologies and LAN Management. Upon completion of the instructional phase, juniors (over the summer) and seniors (during the school year) may be placed in paid internships with employers such as the FDA, NOAA, NASA, USDA, Lockheed Martin, and Northrop Grumman, etc. The Cisco Networking Academy presents basic networking education to equip students with knowledge and skills that can be applied toward entry-level careers in IT networking and CCENT or CCNA certification. The school has 16 computer labs with 900 computers, translating into a computer for every 2.3 students. Springbrook's computer science program is among the oldest in the state and includes courses in Java and XNA, digital art, LAN management, computer maintenance, and web design.

Springbrook also houses the Justice, Law and Society Academy for the Northeast Consortium. The program is designed for students interested in exploring careers in law, law enforcement and government.

Springbrook's music program was awarded Grammy Signature School status in 2008, recognizing Springbrook as one of the top high school music programs in the nation. The music program has won a number of Superior ratings as well as first place awards in local, national and international music festivals across the nation as well as in Canada. Springbrook's performing ensembles include Symphonic Band (open to all students), Jazz Band (advanced level honors), Symphonic Band, Marching Band, as well as audition-only chamber music ensembles (Strings, Woodwind, Brass-Wind, Percussion and a Jazz Combo). Springbrook's annual Summer Instrumental Music and Jazz Camp, open to middle and high school students from throughout Montgomery County, has been a tradition since 2002. Art classes offered at Springbrook include Foundations of Art, Photography, Ceramics, Studio, 3D Art, TV Production, IB and AP Art and Digital Art.

Springbrook was home to a Navy Junior Reserve Officers' Training Corps (NJROTC) unit, however, it was disbanded in 2010 after having poor enrollment figures for several years. The remnants of the unit were consolidated into a preexisting one at neighboring Paint Branch High School.

== Scholarship ==
Springbrook's students are drawn from a range of racial, ethnic, and economic backgrounds, with roots in 84 nations. Springbook's diversity is reflected in the school's Hall of Nations and celebrated in an annual Heritage Show which showcases student talent including dance ensembles from several cultures.

The Washington Post publishes a Challenge Index based on statistical analysis of academic rigor and achievement among high schools in the Washington metropolitan area (covering school districts in Maryland, Northern Virginia, and the District of Columbia). In the December 2006 Challenge Index, Springbrook ranked 7 out of 23 high schools in Montgomery County, and 26 among 185 high schools in the metro area; and placed well ahead of its traditional peer schools (and athletic rivals), Blair (a science magnet school, ranked 33 in the metro area), Paint Branch (62), and Blake (94).

== Athletics ==
Since 1964, the Blue Devils have fielded a total of 18 state championship athletic teams, including seven state football championships between 1979 and 1989. the field hockey team was state champion in 2003 and state finalist in 2005; and the gymnastics team won the state title in 2003.

Springbrook High School's varsity boys basketball team won their third consecutive 4A state championship on March 13, 2010.

Sports offered include:

Fall sports

- Cheerleading (Varsity and Jr. Varsity)
- Girls Cross Country (2011 Division Champions)
- Boys Cross Country (2011 Division Champions)
- Field Hockey (Varsity and Jr. Varsity) (Girls 2011 Division Champions)
- Football (Varsity and Jr. Varsity)
- Golf
- Poms
- Girls Soccer (Varsity and Jr. Varsity)
- Boys Soccer (Varsity and Jr. Varsity)
- Girls Tennis
- Allied Track and Field
- Girls Volleyball (Varsity and Jr. Varsity)

Winter sports

- Girls Basketball (Varsity and Jr. Varsity)
- Boys Basketball (Varsity and Jr. Varsity)
- Allied Bocce
- Varsity Cheerleading
- Girls Indoor Track and Field
- Boys Indoor Track and Field
- Poms
- Girls Swim and Dive
- Boys Swim and Dive
- Wrestling (Varsity and Jr. Varsity) (best record in the county for the previous five years)

Spring sports

- Baseball (Varsity and Jr. Varsity)
- Girls Lacrosse (Varsity and Jr. Varsity)
- Boys Lacrosse (Varsity and Jr. Varsity)
- Softball (Varsity and Jr. Varsity)
- Boys Tennis
- Girls Track and Field
- Boys Track and Field
- Boys Volleyball (Varsity and Jr. Varsity)
- Coed Volleyball
- Gymnastics

== Teachers and faculty ==
As of 2022, the student to teacher ratio is 15:1. As of 2017, 83.8% of staff have over 5 years of professional experience and 54.2% of staff have more than 15 years of professional experience.

== Notable alumni ==
- George Sterman (1964) - theoretical physicist; Director of the C. N. Yang Institute for Theoretical Physics at Stony Brook University
- Lewis Black (1966) – author and comedian, The Daily Show
- Tom Brosius (1968) – track and field athlete
- John Bunting (1968) – former head football coach, University of North Carolina
- Dana Lee Dembrow (1971) – Maryland legislator
- Harold Solomon (1971) – tennis player, ranked No. 5 in the world in 1980
- C. J. Mahaney (1972) – evangelical minister
- Lacy Clay (1974) – U.S. congressman, Democrat (MO-1)
- Craig Esherick (1974) – former head basketball coach, Georgetown University
- Susan Gelman (1975) – psychologist, University of Michigan
- Carol Black (1976) – television producer and writer creator, The Wonder Years
- Louise Kellogg (1977) – geophysicist, University of California, Davis
- Thalia Zedek (1979) – musician, Come, Live Skull, Uzi
- Mary Page Keller (1979) – actress, JAG, Duet, Ryan's Hope, Timecop 2
- Chuck Driesell (1981) – former head basketball coach, The Citadel
- Tina Fernandes Botts (1982) – philosophy professor, California State University, Fresno
- Douglas JJ Peters (1981) – Maryland State Senator, District 23
- Matthew Rabin (1981) – behavioral economist, Harvard University
- Andrew Gelman (1982) – statistician and political scientist, Columbia University
- Jill Rutten (1986) – soccer player who appeared for the United States women's national team
- Jeri Ingram (1988) – tennis player
- Shane Acker (1990) – Oscar-nominated writer and director, 9 short film, 9
- Kimberly Sellers (1990) – statistician
- Michael Ealy (1991) – actor, Barbershop, Underworld: Awakening, Seven Pounds
- Bram Weinstein (1991) – television sports anchor, ESPNews
- Shawn Springs (1993) – former NFL cornerback
- Doris Tsao (1993) – neuroscientist, California Institute of Technology
- Steve Weissman (1997) – television sports anchor, ESPN
- Joanna Lohman (2000) – professional women's soccer, Washington Spirit
- Brandon Broady (2004) – comedian/TV host, Nickelodeon's Crashletes, 106 & Park (correspondent)
- Folarin Campbell (2004) – basketball player,George Mason University
- Dave East (2006) – rapper
- Jamal Olasewere (2009) – basketball player, Nigeria national basketball team
- Demetric Austin (2012) – basketball player, Panionios B.C.
- Isaiah Eisendorf (2014) – American-Israeli basketball player in the Israeli Basketball Premier League
