= Charles McCullough =

Charles McCullough may refer to:

- Charles McCullough (Northern Ireland politician) (1923–2014), Northern Irish unionist politician
- Charles A. McCullough II (born 1978), American politician and civil rights activist
- Sir Charles McCullough (judge) (1931–2018), British barrister and judge
- Charlie McCullough (1866–1898), Major League Baseball pitcher

== See also ==
- Charles S. McCullough House, a historic home in Darlington, Darlington County, South Carolina
