= White Oak, Maryland =

- Census-designated place
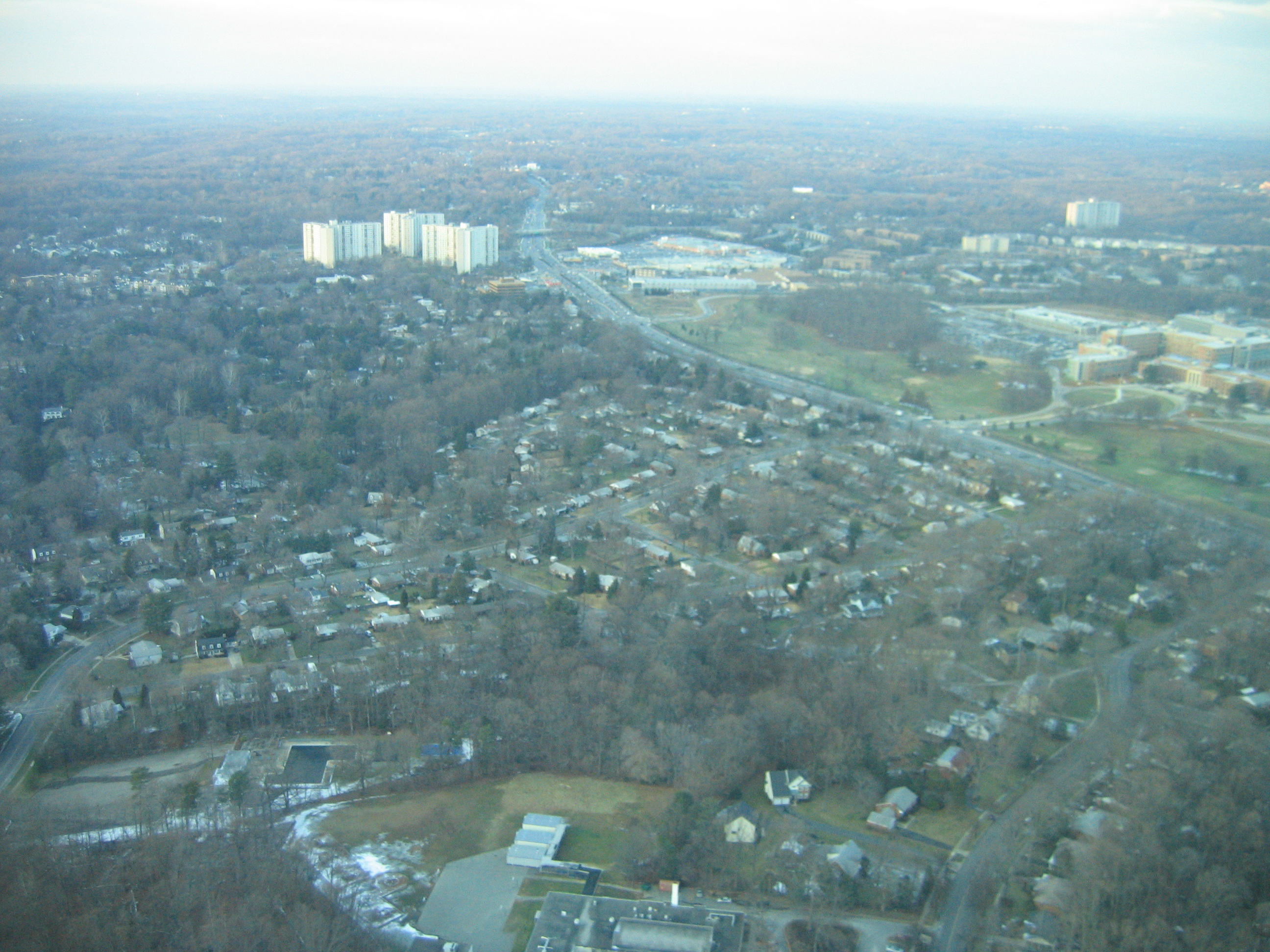
- Aerial view of White Oak in January 2007

- Location in Montgomery County and Maryland
- Coordinates: 39°02′23″N 76°59′35″W
- Country: United States
- State: Maryland
- County: Montgomery

Area
  - Total: 3.12 sq mi (8.09 km^{2})
  - Land: 3.12 sq mi (8.09 km^{2})
  - Water: 0 sq mi (0.00 km^{2})
- Elevation: 387 ft (118 m)

Population (2020)
  - Total: 16,347
  - Density: 5,234.8/sq mi (2,021.15/km^{2})
- Time zone: UTC-05:00 (Eastern (EST))
  - Summer (DST): UTC−4 (EDT)
- FIPS code: 24-84375
- GNIS feature ID: 0591544

White Oak is a census-designated place and unincorporated area in Montgomery County, Maryland, United States. It had a population of 16,347 in 2020.

White Oak was known for its Naval Ordnance Laboratory, which was closed in 1994. The headquarters of the Food and Drug Administration now occupies the property, which has been renamed the Federal Research Center at White Oak. According to the United States Census Bureau, the locality has a total area of 3.78 square miles (9.79 km^{2}), all land.

White Oak is a diverse neighborhood. The main area of White Oak is from Lockwood Drive starting from New Hampshire Avenue (MD 650) towards Stewart Lane, crossing Columbia Pike (U.S. 29).

== Geography ==
As an unincorporated area, White Oak's boundaries are not officially defined by either a municipal government or by the government of Montgomery County. Boundaries for the White Oak census-designated place have been established by the United States Census Bureau, while the United States Geological Survey recognizes White Oak to be a populated place located at 39°02′23″N 76°59′35″W (39.039832, –76.993032). Many of its residents consider themselves to be residents of the White Oak neighborhood of Silver Spring, similar to how large cities have different neighborhoods within their borders.

== Quaint Acres ==
Quaint Acres is a subdivision of White Oak just north of modern Route 29 and west of New Hampshire Avenue. The subdivision was named after the house of Altus Lacy Quaintance, a State Entomologist of Maryland who worked at the Maryland Agricultural College and later at the USDA.

On 26 May 1945, a North American TB-25D Mitchell bomber en route from Biloxi to Bolling Field crashed near Quaint Acres, killing all four aboard. The bomber was piloted by Dudley M. Outcalt who flew in the 94th Aero Squadron during World War I.

After the war, the Quaint Acres subdivision was home to famed naturalist Rachel Carson and where she wrote Silent Spring in 1962, the book that facilitated the ban of the pesticide DDT in the United States. She built the ranch house at 11701 Berwick Rd. in 1956, and lived there until her death in 1964. The house is a National Historic Landmark, but not open to the public.

Quaint Acres was also the Washington-area home to Margaret Chase Smith, the first woman to be elected to both the U.S. House and the Senate.

== Demographics ==
Historical population
Census	Pop.	Note	%±
2000	20,973		—
2010	17,403		−17.0%
2020	16,347		−6.1%
U.S. Decennial Census; 2010 2020; Boundaries reduced from 2000-2010

=== Racial and ethnic composition ===
White Oak CDP, Maryland – Racial and ethnic composition Note: the US Census treats Hispanic/Latino as an ethnic category. This table excludes Latinos from the racial categories and assigns them to a separate category. Hispanics/Latinos may be of any race.
Race / Ethnicity (NH = Non-Hispanic)	Pop 2000	Pop 2010	Pop 2020	% 2000	% 2010	% 2020
White alone (NH)	7,358	3,766	1,827	35.94%	21.64%	11.18%
Black or African American alone (NH)	7,606	8,314	9,201	36.27%	47.77%	56.29%
Native American or Alaska Native alone (NH)	59	23	15	0.28%	0.13%	0.09%
Asian alone (NH)	2,341	1,543	1,166	11.16%	8.87%	7.13%
Native Hawaiian or Pacific Islander alone (NH)	18	23	1	0.09%	0.13%	0.01%
Other race alone (NH)	89	95	102	0.42%	0.55%	0.62%
Mixed race or Multiracial (NH)	600	445	491	2.86%	2.56%	3.00%
Hispanic or Latino (any race)	2,722	3,194	3,544	12.98%	18.35%	21.68%
Total	20,973	17,403	16,347	100.00%	100.00%	100.00%

=== 2020 census ===
As of the 2020 census, White Oak had a population of 16,347. The median age was 35.8 years. 25.8% of residents were under the age of 18 and 11.8% of residents were 65 years of age or older. For every 100 females there were 88.2 males, and for every 100 females age 18 and over there were 82.6 males age 18 and over.

100.0% of residents lived in urban areas, while 0.0% lived in rural areas.

There were 5,995 households in White Oak, of which 37.4% had children under the age of 18 living in them. Of all households, 36.4% were married-couple households, 20.3% were households with a male householder and no spouse or partner present, and 38.1% were households with a female householder and no spouse or partner present. About 27.5% of all households were made up of individuals and 8.5% had someone living alone who was 65 years of age or older.

There were 6,422 housing units, of which 6.6% were vacant. The homeowner vacancy rate was 1.0% and the rental vacancy rate was 7.2%.

=== 2010 census ===
As of the census of 2010, there were 17,403 people, 6,520 households, and 4,227 families residing in the White Oak area. The population density was 4,605.2 people per square mile (11,927.4/km^{2}). There were 6,865 housing units at an average density of 1,816.1 per square mile (701.2/km^{2}). The racial makeup of the area was 27.7% White, 49.4% African American, 0.4% Native American, 8.9% Asian, 0.1% Pacific Islander, 9.1% from other races, and 4.5% from two or more races. Hispanic or Latino of any race were 18.4% of the population. 6% of White Oak's residents were White Hispanics/Latinos, 21.6% were Hispanics/Latinos from some other race, and 1.5% were Afro-Latinos. 21.6% of the population were non-Hispanic whites, 47.8% were non-Hispanic blacks, and 8.9% were non-Hispanic Asians.

=== Demographic estimates ===
The largest ancestry groups by race, according to current estimates, were:

- 53.2% African, Afro-Caribbean, or African American (12.5% other Sub-Saharan African, 4.1% Ethiopian, 1.8% Haitian, 1.4% Jamaican, 0.7% Kenyan)
- 17.6% White (3.2% German, 2.9% American, 2.4% English, 2.3% Irish, 1.6% Italian, 0.9% Polish)
- 19.1% Hispanic or Latino (9.4% Salvadoran, 2.69% Dominican, 1.38% Guatemalan, 1.27% Mexican, 1.26% Puerto Rican)
- 7.1% Asian (2.49% Vietnamese, 1.66% Korean, 1.11% Indian, 0.83% Chinese)

=== Religion ===
White Oak is home to a large population Orthodox and Conservative Jews. The Silver Spring Eruv Association includes parts of White Oak and the nearby neighborhoods of Kemp Mill and Colesville. An earlier eruv existed around the White Oak Apartments, until the larger eruv was constructed. White Oak is home to an Orthodox synagogue, the Southeast Hebrew Congregation. Southeast Hebrew was originally founded by Orthodox Eastern European immigrants in 1909 on Capitol Hill in Washington, D.C. Many Jews began to move out of Southeast Washington beginning in the 1930s and Southeast Hebrew was relocated to White Oak in 1971. Between 1965 and 2011, White Oak was home to Shaare Tefila Congregation, a Conservative synagogue. Shaare Tefila was originally founded in Riggs Park, a historically Jewish neighborhood in Washington, D.C., once known as DC's "Little Tel Aviv." Founded in 1951, Shaare Tefila was relocated to White Oak in 1965. In 2011, Shaare Tefila was relocated again, moving to Olney where many young members now reside.

== Education ==
Depending on how White Oak is geographically defined, students attend Cresthaven, Jackson Road and Burnt Mills Elementary Schools, which feed into White Oak and Francis Scott Key Middle School. Eighth-grade students have the option of choosing between the three Northeast Consortium schools, Blake High School, Paint Branch High School, and Springbrook High School.

Springbrook is located in the White Oak CDP.
