= Calverton, Maryland =

- Census-designated place
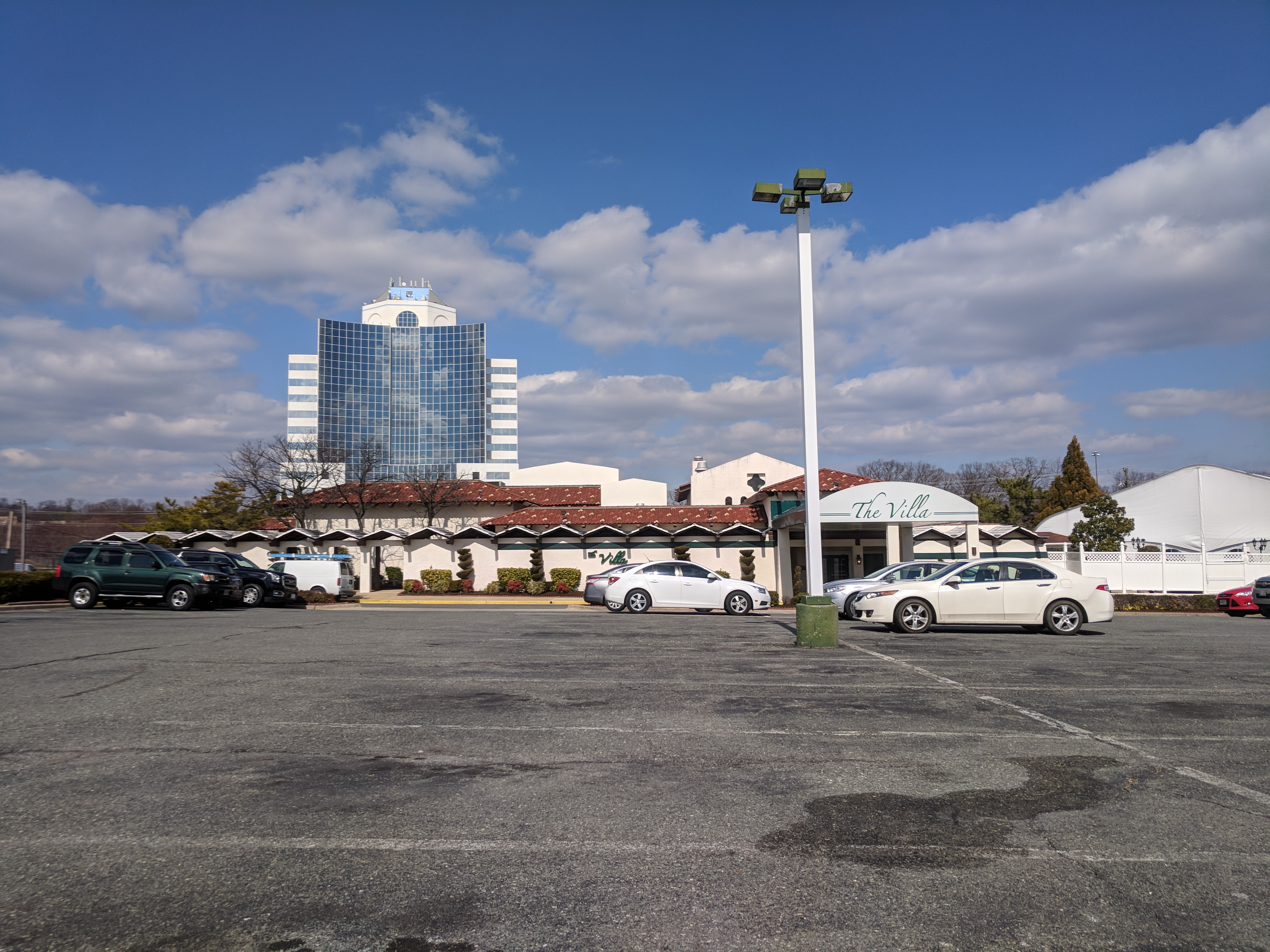
- The Villa and Calverton Tower in March 2018

- Location of Calverton, Maryland
- Coordinates: 39°03′28″N 76°56′56″W
- Country: United States
- State: Maryland
- Counties: Montgomery; Prince George's

Area
  - Total: 4.59 sq mi (11.90 km^{2})
  - Land: 4.58 sq mi (11.85 km^{2})
  - Water: 0.019 sq mi (0.05 km^{2})
- Elevation: 289 ft (88 m)

Population (2020)
  - Total: 17,316
  - Density: 3,784.2/sq mi (1,461.08/km^{2})
- Time zone: UTC−5 (Eastern (EST))
  - Summer (DST): UTC−4 (EDT)
- Postal code(s): 20904, 20705
- Area codes: 301, 240
- FIPS code: 24-12350
- GNIS feature ID: 2389269

Calverton is an unincorporated area and census-designated place located on the boundary between Montgomery and Prince George's counties, Maryland, in the United States. as of the 2020 census, it had a population of 17,316.

== Geography ==
As an unincorporated area, Calverton's boundaries are not officially defined. Recognized by the United States Census Bureau and the United States Geological Survey as a census-designated place, Calverton is part of the Baltimore/Washington metropolitan area. It is located between Beltsville and Silver Spring, with nearby area including Laurel, Hillandale, and Adelphi. The Prince George's County side of Calverton (postal code 20705) is considered a neighborhood of Beltsville, while the Montgomery County side (postal code 20904) is associated with Silver Spring.

According to the United States Census Bureau, Calverton has a total area of 4.6 square miles (12.0 km^{2}), of which 0.02 square miles (0.05 km^{2}), or 0.44%, is water.

== Demographics ==
Historical population
Census	Pop.	Note	%±
2000	12,610		—
2010	17,724		40.6%
2020	17,316		−2.3%
U.S. Decennial Census; 2010 2020

=== Racial and ethnic composition ===
Calverton CDP, Maryland – Racial and ethnic composition Note: the US Census treats Hispanic/Latino as an ethnic category. This table excludes Latinos from the racial categories and assigns them to a separate category. Hispanics/Latinos may be of any race.
Race / Ethnicity (NH = Non-Hispanic)	Pop 2000	Pop 2010	Pop 2020	% 2000	% 2010	% 2020
White alone (NH)	5,087	5,379	3,265	40.34%	30.35%	18.86%
Black or African American alone (NH)	4,234	6,500	7,397	33.58%	36.67%	42.72%
Native American or Alaska Native alone (NH)	15	27	24	0.12%	0.15%	0.14%
Asian alone (NH)	2,082	2,787	2,646	16.51%	15.72%	15.28%
Native Hawaiian or Pacific Islander alone (NH)	1	9	6	0.01%	0.05%	0.03%
Other race alone (NH)	41	64	96	0.33%	0.36%	0.55%
Mixed race or Multiracial (NH)	347	472	571	2.75%	2.66%	3.30%
Hispanic or Latino (any race)	803	2,486	3,311	6.37%	14.03%	19.12%
Total	12,610	17,724	17,316	100.00%	100.00%	100.00%

=== 2020 census ===
As of the 2020 census, Calverton had a population of 17,316. The median age was 42.4 years. 20.7% of residents were under the age of 18 and 20.8% of residents were 65 years of age or older. For every 100 females there were 88.6 males, and for every 100 females age 18 and over there were 84.6 males age 18 and over.

100.0% of residents lived in urban areas, while 0.0% lived in rural areas.

There were 6,072 households in Calverton, of which 30.3% had children under the age of 18 living in them. Of all households, 45.4% were married-couple households, 16.3% were households with a male householder and no spouse or partner present, and 34.6% were households with a female householder and no spouse or partner present. About 29.3% of all households were made up of individuals and 17.6% had someone living alone who was 65 years of age or older.

There were 6,360 housing units, of which 4.5% were vacant. The homeowner vacancy rate was 1.1% and the rental vacancy rate was 6.9%.

=== 2000 census ===
At the 2000 census, there were 12,610 people, 4,543 households and 3,230 families residing in the area. The population density was 2,673.1 inhabitants per square mile (1,032.1/km^{2}). There were 4,661 housing units at an average density of 988.1 units per square mile (381.5 units/km^{2}). The racial makeup of the area was 43.09% White, 34.06% African American, 0.14% Native American, 16.52% Asian, 0.01% Pacific Islander, 2.61% from other races, and 3.57% from two or more races. Hispanic or Latino of any race were 6.37% of the population.

There were 4,543 households, of which 35.7% had children under the age of 18 living with them, 54.4% were married couples living together, 13.0% had a female householder with no husband present, and 28.9% were non-families. 23.5% of all households were made up of individuals, and 4.0% had someone living alone who was 65 years of age or older. The average household size was 2.73 and the average family size was 3.24.

25.0% of the population were under the age of 18, 7.6% from 18 to 24, 33.0% from 25 to 44, 24.0% from 45 to 64, and 10.4% who were 65 years of age or older. The median age was 36 years. For every 100 females, there were 91.4 males. For every 100 females age 18 and over, there were 86.0 males.

The median household income was $63,990 and the median family income was $72,958. Males had a median income of $44,425 and females $39,563. The per capita income was $28,107. About 2.5% of families and 4.0% of the population were below the poverty line, including 2.7% of those under age 18 and 2.5% of those age 65 or over.

== Government and infrastructure ==
Prince George's County Police Department District 6 Station in Beltsville CDP serves the portion of Calverton in PG County.

The U.S. Postal Service operates the Colesville Carrier Annex in the Montgomery County side of Calverton CDP.

== Education ==
=== Primary and secondary schools ===
==== Public schools ====
Children living on the Montgomery County side of Calverton attend public schools in the Montgomery County Public Schools system. They generally attend:

- Galway Elementary School on Galway Drive in Calverton CDP.
- Briggs Chaney Middle School on Rainbow Drive in Cloverly CDP
- Paint Branch High School on Old Columbia Pike in Fairland CDP

Children living on the Prince George's County side of Calverton attend public schools in the Prince George's County Public Schools system. They generally attend:

- Calverton Elementary School on Beltsville Road in Calverton CDP
- Martin Luther King Middle School on Amendale Road in Beltsville CDP.
- High Point High School on Powder Mill Road in Beltsville CDP.
