= Baba Oladotun =

American basketball player (born 2008)

No. 10 – Maryland Terrapins
- Position: Small forward
- Conference: Big Ten Conference

Personal information
- Born: December 15, 2008 (age 17) Silver Spring, Maryland, U.S.
- Listed height: 6 ft 10 in (2.08 m)
- Listed weight: 205 lb (93 kg)

Career information
- High school: James Hubert Blake (Cloverly, Maryland)
- College: Maryland (2026–present)

Babatunde Oladotun (born December 15, 2008) is an American college basketball player for the Maryland Terrapins of the Big Ten Conference.

== Early life and high school ==
Oladotun attended James Hubert Blake High School located in Cloverly, Maryland. His father, Ibrahim Oladotun, played college basketball at Virginia Tech.

=== Recruiting ===
Oladotun was initially rated as the top men's basketball recruit in the class of 2027, however he reclassified to be in the 2026 recruiting class. He was a consensus five-star recruit in the class of 2026, and received scholarship offers from dozens of traditional college basketball powerhouses before ultimately narrowing his choice to two local schools: Georgetown University and the University of Maryland.

On November 19, 2025, Oladotun announced his commitment to Maryland in a ceremony at his high school. He became the highest-rated recruit to commit to the Terrapins since Diamond Stone in the class of 2015.

College recruiting
| Name | Hometown | School | Height | Weight | Commit date |
|---|---|---|---|---|---|
| Baba Oladotun; SF | Silver Spring, MD | James Hubert Blake (MD) | 6 ft 10 in (2.08 m) | 190 lb (86 kg) | Nov 19, 2025 |
| Baba Oladotun; SF | Recruit ratings: Rivals: 247Sports: ESPN: (93) | | | | |
Overall recruit ranking: Rivals: 14 247Sports: 8 ESPN: 8
Note: In many cases, Scout, Rivals, 247Sports, On3, and ESPN may conflict in their listings of height and weight.; In these cases, the average was taken. ESPN grades are on a 100-point scale.; Sources: "Maryland Terrapins 2026 Recruiting Class". ESPN.; "2026 Team Ranking". Rivals.
