= Tilden Middle School =

Tilden Middle School may refer to:

- Tilden Middle School - Rockville, Maryland - Montgomery County Public Schools
- William T. Tilden Middle School - Philadelphia, Pennsylvania - School District of Philadelphia
