= Demetric =

Demetric is a given name. Notable people with the name include:

- Demetric Austin (born 1995), American basketball player
- Demetric Evans (born 1979), American football player
- Demetric Felton (born 1998), American football player

== See also ==
- Demetrice
