= Sherwood High School (Maryland) =

Public high school in Sandy Spring, Maryland

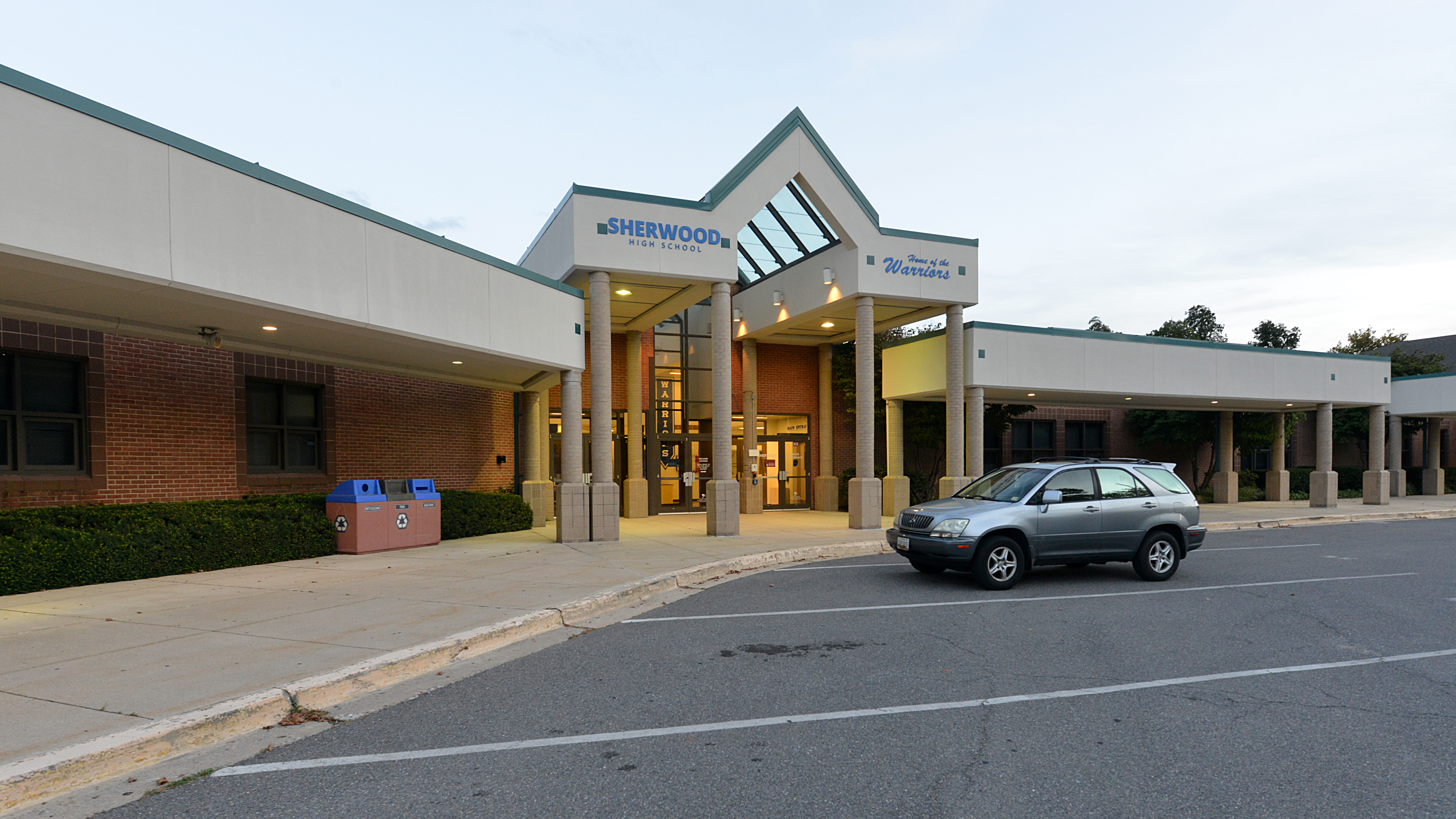

Location
- 300 Olney-Sandy Spring Road; Sandy Spring, Maryland 20860; United States; 39°8′55.32″N 77°1′6.35″W

Information
- Type: Public high school
- Motto: Respect for Each, Rigor for Each, Reach out to Each
- Established: 1906; 120 years ago
- School district: Montgomery County Public Schools
- CEEB code: 210940
- NCES School ID: 240048000921
- Principal: Micah E. Wiggins
- Teaching staff: 98 FTE (2022–23)
- Grades: 9–12
- Gender: Co-educational
- Enrollment: 1,721 (2022–23)
- Student to teacher ratio: 17.52 (2022–23)
- Campus: Suburban
- Colors: Blue, white, black
- Song: "Among the Leafy Branches"
- Athletics conference: MPSSAA 3A
- Mascot: Warriors
- Newspaper: The Warrior
- Yearbook: Leaves
- Feeder schools: Farquhar Middle School, Rosa Parks Middle School
- Website: montgomeryschoolsmd.org/schools/sherwoodhs/

Sherwood High School is a public high school in Sandy Spring in unincorporated Montgomery County, Maryland, United States. It is part of the Montgomery County Public Schools system. Sherwood's program of interest is the international studies program, and it is also known for its music and athletic programs.

== History ==
Sherwood Academy was built on a piece of land donated in 1883, that was once part of Sherwood Farm – named because the abundance of trees was reminiscent of Robin Hood's Sherwood Forest.

In 1906, Sherwood became the third public high school in Montgomery County, after Richard Montgomery High School and Gaithersburg High School. The original school building was replaced in 1950, and the 1,000-seat Ertzman theatre was added in 1974. The school was renovated from 1989 until 1991, during which students were temporarily moved to the Northwood High School building in Silver Spring.

During the summer of 2007, a new wing was added to the school, creating new classrooms for science and English.

== Student body ==
Sherwood High School had 1,721 students enrolled for the 2022–23 school year. The school's student body was 48% non-Hispanic Caucasian, 16% African American, 11% Asian, and 19% Hispanic. The graduation rate for the school was 89.8%, with 76.5% meeting the University of Maryland entrance requirements. Sherwood students had an average SAT score of 554 (math), 573 (verbal), and 1127 (total), the same as the county average. Approximately 52.1% of graduates received a passing grade on an Advanced Placement exam.

== Academics ==
The International Studies Program distinguishes the school by providing a uniquely-focused program. The program was established in 1998, coinciding with broader restructuring that occurred with the opening of the nearby James Hubert Blake High School. Blake High School, along with Paint Branch High School and Springbrook High School, formed the Northeast Consortium of schools. Sherwood was originally intended to be part of the consortium, but was ultimately not included. The consortium provides each with a uniquely specialized program which students can opt for instead of attending their local school. While Sherwood is not a member of the consortium, it established the International Studies Program. Sherwood is a member of the International Studies Schools Association, a national network of schools dedicated to improving students' understanding of the world.

In 2006, Sherwood High School was listed in Newsweek's top 1200 American High Schools, as the 388th highest-rated school in the country, up 61 places from its 2005 ranking of 449.

A new system of academies was implemented beginning with the class of 2013. Students choose from four academies: Business and Hospitality; Engineering and Technology; Science; and Arts and Humanities. The academies allow students to specialize in their area of interest.

== Areas served ==
Sherwood serves the areas of Olney, Ashton, Sandy Spring, and Brookeville. It draws students from two middle schools and five elementary schools:

- William H. Farquhar MS
  - Brooke Grove ES
  - Sherwood ES*
- Rosa Parks MS
  - Belmont ES
  - Greenwood ES
  - Olney ES

*a portion of Sherwood ES also articulates to the Northeast Consortium, where their base high school is James Hubert Blake High School.

== Music ==
Sherwood High School has regionally-known music programs, including the annual Rock 'n Roll Revival show which was established in 1971. The original concept for the show was conceived by a group of Sherwood students who were inspired after seeing a concert at Madison Square Garden in October 1971. Faculty members also appeared in the first show in 1972. The show includes the performance of a mix of songs from the late 1950s to the late 1990s. Each March, Rock 'n' Roll Revival has performances over two weekends at Ertzman Theatre, with a seventh performance for students in area middle and elementary schools.

Sherwood High School also has an Instrumental Music Department and offers jazz band, jazz lab, concert band, and symphonic orchestra. Also offered are choruses including jazz choir, show choir, and a women's chorus.

== Athletics ==
The Sherwood Warriors have won Maryland state championships in the following sports:

- Baseball: 2008, 2010, 2021, 2022, 2023, 2025
  - First ever consecutive three-time state baseball champion in MPSSAA class 4A (or equivalent)
- Basketball (boys): 1979, 2007
- Basketball (girls): 1974, 1976
- Cross Country (boys): 1979, 2003
- Field Hockey: 1980, 1985
- Football: 1995, 1996, 2008
- Golf: 1980, 1994
- Soccer (boys): 1977, 1985, 1986, 1988, 2004, 2005
- Softball: 2012, 2013, 2014, 2015, 2016, 2019, 2022, 2024
  - 105 consecutive games won from 2012–2017, Maryland state record
- Swimming: 2016, 2018, 2019
- Volleyball: 2006, 2010, 2011, 2012
- Wrestling: 1997

Individual championships:

- During the 2008 cross country season, Solomon Haile went undefeated en route the 4A Maryland State individual title and the Footlocker Cross Country Championship individual title.

== Notable alumni ==
- Richie Anderson, NFL fullback
- Ashley Darby, Real Housewives of Potomac cast member
- Katie Feeney, social media personality
- Ray Goodlett, pastor and former professional soccer player
- Justin Maxwell, MLB player
- Young Mazino, actor
- Allison Miller, musician
- Oguchi Onyewu, soccer player and USSF executive
- Marcus Simms, UFL wide receiver
- Scott Van Pelt, ESPN anchor
- Sean Whalen, actor

=== Notable staff ===
- Walt Williams, NBA player, coached basketball at SHS
- Nakeya Brown, American photographer, currently teaching at SHS
