= Brandon Broady =

American actor (born 1986)

Broady
- Born: Brandon Broady; January 23, 1986 (age 40)
- Notable work: BET's the Xperiment Crashletes

Comedy career
- Years active: 2010–present
- Medium: comedy, film, radio personality, television personality

Brandon A. Broady (born 1986) is an American comedian, actor and television host best known for hosting BET's The Xperiment.

== Early life ==
Broady grew up in Silver Spring, Maryland and attended Springbrook High School and Towson University.
