= Darnell Dockett =

American football player (born 1981)

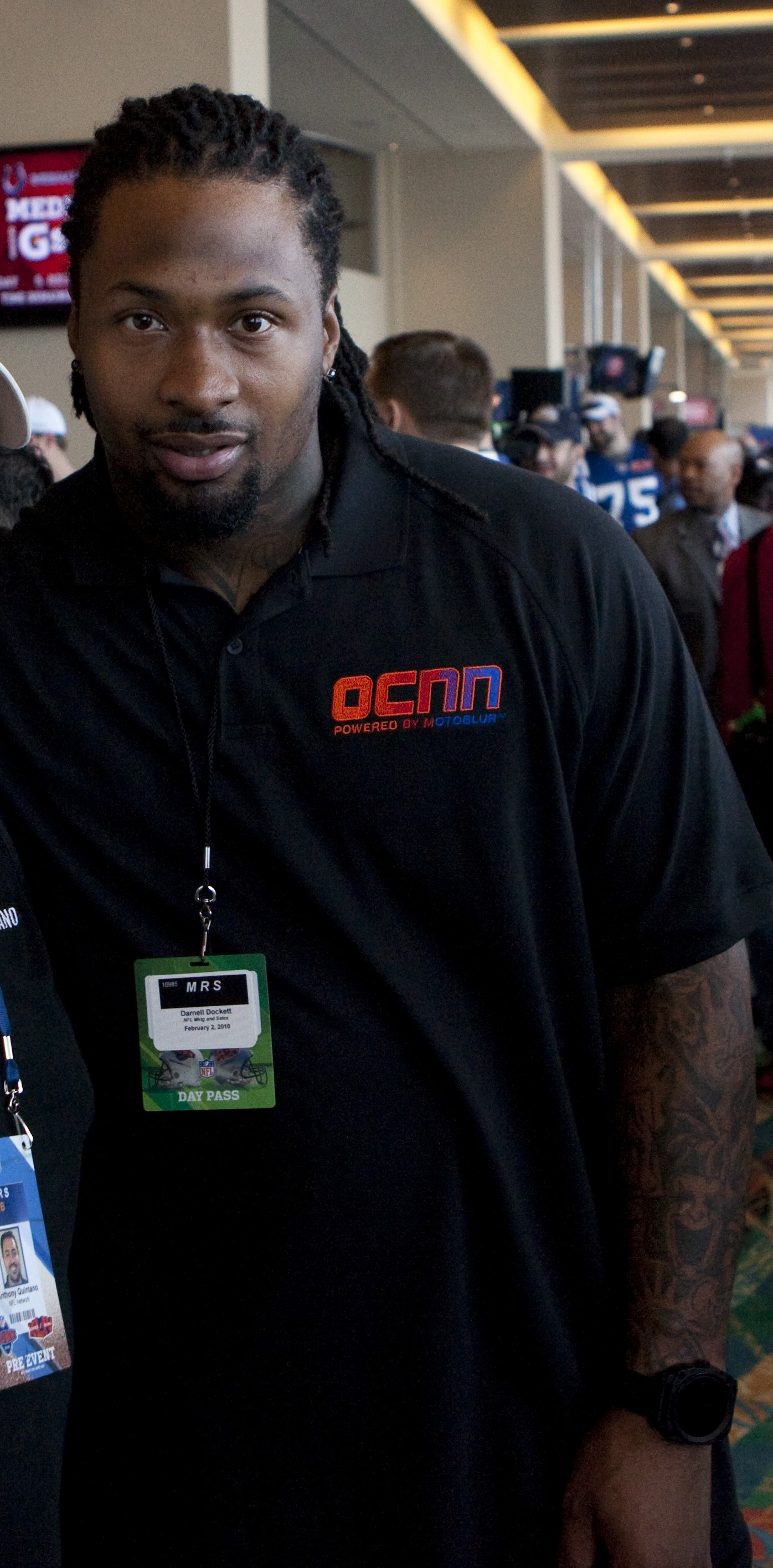
- Dockett at Super Bowl XLIV Media Day

No. 90
- Positions: Defensive end, defensive tackle

Personal information
- Born: May 27, 1981 (age 45); Burtonsville, Maryland, U.S.
- Listed height: 6 ft 4 in (1.93 m)
- Listed weight: 290 lb (132 kg)

Career information
- High school: Paint Branch (Burtonsville)
- College: Florida State (1999–2003)
- NFL draft: 2004: 3rd round, 64th overall pick

Career history
- Arizona Cardinals (2004–2014); San Francisco 49ers (2015)*
- * Offseason or practice squad member only

Awards and highlights
- Second-team All-Pro (2009); 3× Pro Bowl (2007, 2009, 2010); PFWA All-Rookie Team (2004); National champion (1999); Second-team All-American (2003); ACC Defensive Player of the Year (2003); 2× First-team All-ACC (2001, 2003); Second-team All-ACC (2000)

Career NFL statistics
- Total tackles: 472
- Sacks: 40.5
- Forced fumbles: 9
- Fumble recoveries: 14
- Pass deflections: 9
- Interceptions: 4
- Defensive touchdowns: 2
- Stats at Pro Football Reference

Darnell Maurice Dockett (born May 27, 1981) is an American former professional football player who was a defensive end for 11 seasons with the Arizona Cardinals of the National Football League (NFL). He was selected by the Cardinals in the third round of the 2004 NFL draft. He played college football for the Florida State Seminoles.

Dockett played defensive tackle for the first five seasons of his career until the Cardinals switched to a 3–4 defense, leading him to move to defensive end.

== Early life ==
Dockett started football relatively late. In his first youth league game, he ran the wrong way with a fumble for a safety against his team. He attended Paint Branch High School in Burtonsville, Maryland, where he set a school record with 47 sacks in his career. As a senior, he tallied 171 tackles (109 solo), 15 sacks, two caused fumbles, three recovered, three blocked punts and an interception returned for a touchdown, earning Maryland Player of the Year honors as well as All-American selections by USA Today and Parade.

A highly regarded prospect, Dockett was ranked the No. 17 prospect in the country by The Sporting News. Recruited by numerous schools, Dockett selected Florida State over Ohio State and North Carolina.

== College career ==
Dockett attended Florida State University, where he played for coach Bobby Bowden's Florida State Seminoles football team. After an early season injury, Dockett redshirted his first year at Florida State, as the Seminoles went wire-to-wire as national champions in 1999. In 2000, they had to replace interior defensive linemen Corey Simon and Jerry Johnson in the starting line-up. Dockett successfully secured a spot, starting the last 10 games of the year at defensive tackle. He recorded 66 total tackles (including 32 unassisted), which was most of any freshmen on the team, and tied for the team lead in tackles for loss (19). Dockett also added a team-high 18 quarterback hurries, and seven sacks (third on the team). His performance earned him freshman All-America honors, and he was named the freshman defensive player of the year by Football News.

As a sophomore, Dockett emerged as one of the best defensive lineman in college football, starting all 12 games for the Seminoles, including the 2002 Gator Bowl. While frequently drawing double-teams, he led all defensive linemen with 68 total tackles and set a new Florida State single season record with 22 tackles for loss. In the final game of the regular season against Georgia Tech, he established a new school record with five tackles for loss in a single game. Dockett also led the team with 19 quarterback hurries and two forced fumbles. He was a first-team All-ACC selection.

Having become a fixture at defensive tackle, Dockett started all 13 games of his junior season, and made at least four tackles in 12 of those games. Constant double-teams resulted in fewer sacks and tackles for loss on the season, still he managed to break Ron Simmons' 22-year-old school record of 44 career tackles for loss against Clemson. He was also second on the team with 15 quarterback hurries. He was suspended from the team for the 2003 Sugar Bowl, after pleading guilty to a misdemeanor theft charge.

Dockett finished his college career as a four-year starter. He recorded 10.5 sacks, and 247 tackles (123 solo tackles, 124 assisted tackles), and set a school record with 65 tackles for loss.

== Professional career ==
Pre-draft measurables
| Height | Weight | Arm length | Hand span | 40-yard dash | 10-yard split | 20-yard split | Vertical jump | Broad jump | Bench press |
|---|---|---|---|---|---|---|---|---|---|
| 6 ft 3 3/8 in (1.91 m) | 297 lb (135 kg) | 32 1/8 in (0.82 m) | 10 in (0.25 m) | 5.03 s | 1.75 s | 2.91 s | 31 in (0.79 m) | 8 ft 9 in (2.67 m) | 26 reps |
All values from NFL Combine

=== Arizona Cardinals ===
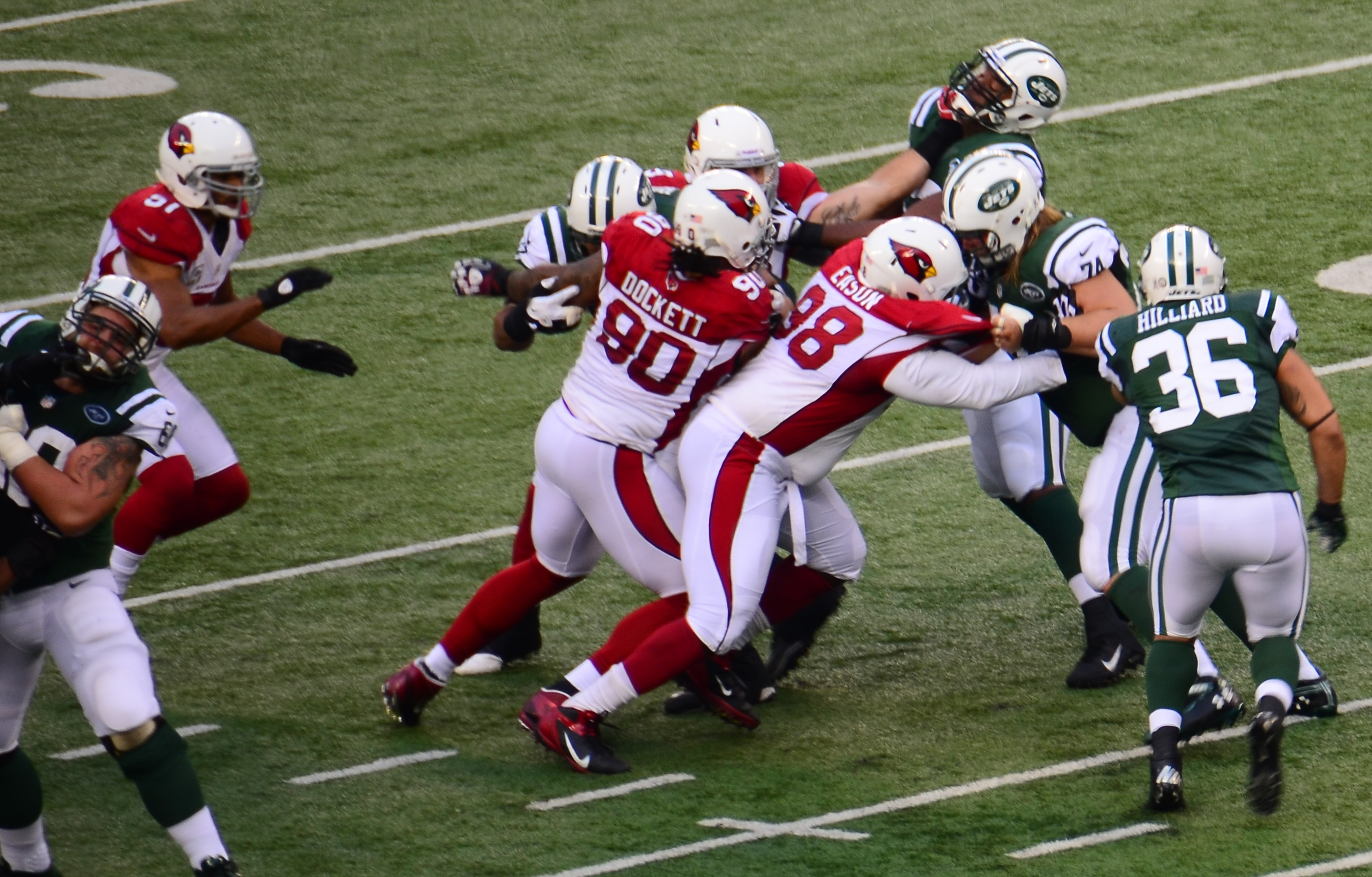
Dockett (#90) against the New York Jets in 2012.

Although projected a late first-round selection, Dockett was selected by the Arizona Cardinals in the third round, because his previous arrests and run-ins with coaching staffs scared off a lot of teams. He had a reasonably quiet first few seasons with six sacks in his first three seasons. The 2007 season was his breakout season recording nine sacks in sixteen starts. Then in the 2008/9 season he recorded four sacks in sixteen starts while the Cardinals won the NFC West with a 9–7 record. They then had a surprising playoff run getting to Super Bowl XLIII (which they lost 27–23 to the Pittsburgh Steelers) with Dockett recording three sacks in the game tying Reggie White's record.

With Arizona shifting to a 3-4 defense, Dockett often lined up at defensive end.

Dockett was selected to start in the 2010 Pro Bowl as a Defensive tackle.

On September 1, 2010, the Cardinals signed Dockett to a 6-year, $56 million contract extension, with $30 million guaranteed. This would have kept him with the franchise through the 2015 season. During the press conference, Dockett stated that he wanted to "retire an Arizona Cardinal".

Controversy ensued after the 2010 NFC Championship Game, where Dockett was one of the critics of Chicago Bears quarterback Jay Cutler, tweeting on Twitter: "If I'm on chicago team jay cutler has to wait till me and the team shower get dressed and leave before he comes in the locker room!"

On August 18, 2014, Dockett tore his ACL, ending his 2014 season.

On February 27, 2015, the Cardinals released Dockett.

=== San Francisco 49ers ===
On March 5, 2015, Dockett agreed to a two-year, $7.5 million contract with the San Francisco 49ers. However, on September 4, Dockett was released by the 49ers.

=== Retirement ===
On July 24, 2016, it was announced that Dockett would retire. The next day, he signed a one-day contract to retire with the Cardinals.

=== NFL statistics ===
| Year | Team | GP | COMB | TOTAL | AST | SACK | FF | FR | FR YDS | INT | IR YDS | AVG IR | LNG | TD | PD |
|---|---|---|---|---|---|---|---|---|---|---|---|---|---|---|---|
| 2004 | ARI | 15 | 39 | 33 | 6 | 3.5 | 1 | 1 | 0 | 1 | 20 | 20 | 20 | 0 | 3 |
| 2005 | ARI | 16 | 29 | 19 | 10 | 0.5 | 1 | 0 | 0 | 1 | 14 | 14 | 14 | 0 | 3 |
| 2006 | ARI | 16 | 50 | 36 | 14 | 2.0 | 1 | 2 | 0 | 1 | -1 | -1 | -1 | 0 | 2 |
| 2007 | ARI | 16 | 58 | 43 | 15 | 9.0 | 2 | 2 | 0 | 0 | 0 | 0 | 0 | 0 | 1 |
| 2008 | ARI | 16 | 49 | 37 | 12 | 4.0 | 1 | 3 | 0 | 0 | 0 | 0 | 0 | 0 | 1 |
| 2009 | ARI | 16 | 51 | 42 | 9 | 7.0 | 0 | 0 | 0 | 1 | 3 | 3 | 3 | 0 | 2 |
| 2010 | ARI | 15 | 52 | 45 | 7 | 5.0 | 1 | 2 | 0 | 0 | 0 | 0 | 0 | 0 | 1 |
| 2011 | ARI | 16 | 51 | 35 | 16 | 3.5 | 0 | 2 | 0 | 0 | 0 | 0 | 0 | 0 | 1 |
| 2012 | ARI | 15 | 34 | 23 | 11 | 1.5 | 0 | 0 | 0 | 0 | 0 | 0 | 0 | 0 | 4 |
| 2013 | ARI | 16 | 46 | 36 | 10 | 4.5 | 0 | 0 | 0 | 0 | 0 | 0 | 0 | 0 | 0 |
| Career | | 158 | 459 | 349 | 110 | 40.5 | 7 | 12 | 0 | 4 | 36 | 9 | 20 | 0 | 18 |

== Personal life ==
Dockett's mother was murdered in her home when Dockett was thirteen; no one was ever arrested for the crime. After his father died of cancer four months later, Dockett was raised by his uncle, Kevin Dockett.
