= James Hubert Blake High School =

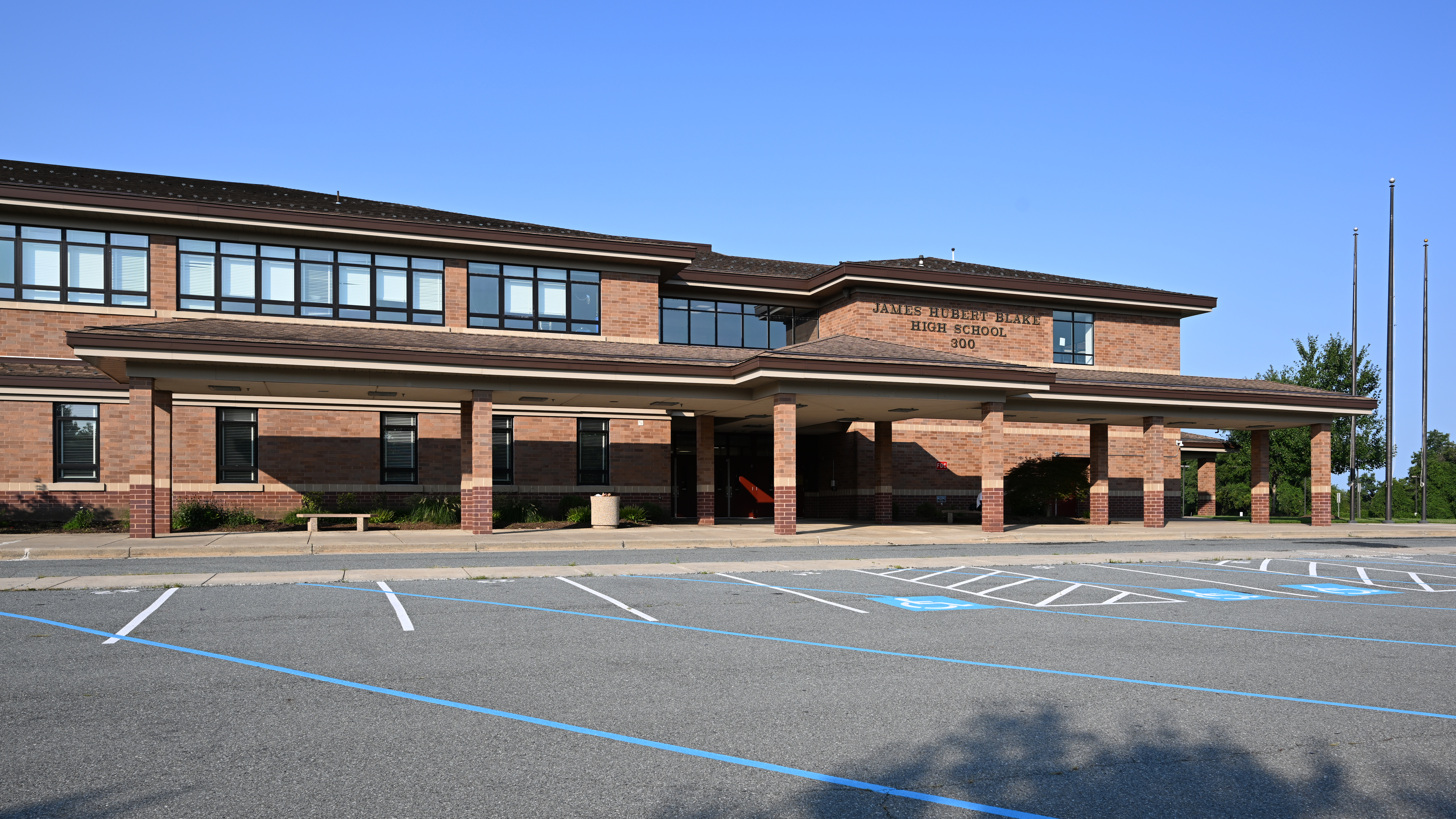

Location
- 800 Norwood Road; Silver Spring, Maryland; United States; 39°6′49″N 77°1′6″W

Information
- Type: Public high school
- Established: 1998; 28 years ago
- School district: Montgomery County Public Schools
- NCES School ID: 240048001044
- Principal: Ahmed Adelekan
- Teaching staff: 102 FTE (2022–23)
- Grades: 9–12
- Enrollment: 1,784 (2022–23)
- Student to teacher ratio: 17.46 (2022–23)
- Campus: Suburban
- Colors: Black, blue, white, silver
- Mascot: Benny the Bengal
- Rivals: Paint Branch High School; Springbrook High School; Sherwood High School
- Newspaper: Blake Beat
- Yearbook: Tempo
- Website: montgomeryschoolsmd.org/schools/blakehs/

James Hubert Blake High School (or Blake High School) is a public high school located in Cloverly, Maryland. It is part of the Montgomery County Public Schools system. Blake offers a signature program in fine arts and humanities.

James Hubert Blake High School is part of the Northeast Consortium, an organization of three area high schools that allows students to select a school based on each school's signature program. The other members of the consortium are Springbrook High School and Paint Branch High School.

== History ==
In the mid-1990s, Sherwood High School's enrollment had exceeded its capacity, and a new high school was needed to relieve classroom sizes. A new high school was built with a capacity of 1,215 students. Construction costs were paid by the state and federal governments.

When deciding the name for the new high school, the community narrowed its choice to two deceased artists raised in Maryland: jazz legend James Hubert "Eubie" Blake and Muppets creator Jim Henson. In a straw poll, Jim Henson won. When the Jim Henson Foundation declined the honor, the high school was named after James Hubert Blake instead.

When opened on August 31, 1998, Blake High School had approximately 819 students enrolled, in the ninth and tenth grades. Eleventh and twelfth grades were added in the following two years, respectively. Carole C. Goodman served as its first principal. Its newspaper was temporarily given the name Blake Blank before being officially named Blake Beat.

== Awards ==
The Maryland Instructional Computer Coordinators Association named Mary Wagner the Outstanding Technology-Using Educator of the Year in 2002. A social studies teacher, Wagner was recognized for her contributions to instructional computing practices.

Barbara Jeweler was named Montgomery County Teacher of the Year in 2003. Jeweler was director of Blake High School's television production program, served as internship coordinator, and taught media arts.

Mary Wagner won The Washington Post's Agnes Meyer Outstanding Teacher Award in 2004. Wagner was recognized for leading field trips, inviting guest speakers, having mock congresses and cabinets, conducting Election Day exit polls, and encouraging debate, all to teach her students about history and government. Wagner also started Blake High School's Gay/Straight Alliance, known as Allies 4 Equality, and she maintained the school's web site.

The National Television Academy awarded Sally Lok the Student Television Award for Excellence in 2004. A senior at Blake High School, Lok was recognized for the script for "Music Piracy", a video documentary about the legality of downloading music from the Internet. Lok served as the lead producer of the documentary.

In 2004, Blake High School's principal, Carole C. Goodman, received the Mark Mann Excellence and Harmony Award. The award letter specifically noted the diversity of Blake High School's community involvement, the school's excellent arts and humanities signature program, and how Goodman encouraged a challenging and creative academic environment.

In 2005, a Blake High School junior, Michael Braun, won the Jeopardy! Teen Tournament.

In 2007, The Washington Post awarded Teresa Carbonell the Agnes Meyer Outstanding Teacher Award for Montgomery County. A Spanish teacher, Carbonnell led the honor roll recognition program at Blake High School and led the junior varsity cheer squad. After Hurricane Katrina, Carbonnell raised $25,000 for the hurricane's victims with a Sunset Jazz Concert performed by students.

The Maryland Association of School Libraries gave Blake High School the Mae I. Graham Award for its outstanding library media program during the 2008–2009 school year. The award letter specifically noted the library staff's effective collaborative work between teachers and parents and the library's excellent collection.

In 2010, "The Washington Post" awarded Allison Finn the Agnes Meyer Outstanding Teacher Award for Montgomery County. An English teacher, Finn all served as a volunteer firefighter/rescuer at the Kensington Volunteer Fire Department. She also served twice as a class advisor, coached an undefeated JV girls soccer team, and taught as an adjunct professor in the PROMAT program for developing teachers at Johns Hopkins University.

A team of seven students won both first-place awards at the local Globe Game Jam in 2015. The students created a strategy and puzzle simulation called "Second Chance" that offers a second chance at life by unlocking clues and unraveling a mysterious medical trauma. The students created the program at Blake High School's gaming and simulation studio, called Bengal Studios, which is part of the school's Interactive Media and Game Development career technology education program.

Students from Blake High School compete in the Washington D.C. edition of It's Academic, a televised academic quiz show. Blake is the only school in the 65-year history of It's Academic to win the DC-area championship four years in a row (2012–15). The team won additional D.C. Championships in 2021, 2024, and 2025. Blake first participated in the show in 2000, and has reached the finals 15 times and won the now-defunct Intercity Super Bowl title four times.

Blake has won state championships in Gymnastics (2005 & 2006) and Boys Basketball (2026).

== Notable alumni ==
- Bibi Bourelly, singer/songwriter (did not graduate)
- Robert Klemko, journalist
- Cam Brown, (did not graduate from Blake) NFL player
- Baba Oladotun, Basketball player for the Maryland Terrapins
- Brady Ebert, former member of the band Turnstile (band)
- Folarin Orimolade, CFL Football Player
- Ryan Frazier (did not graduate from Blake), NBA Assistant Coach
- Charles Snowden (did not graduate from Blake), NFL player
