= Demetrice =

Demetrice is a given name. Notable people with the name include:

- Demetrice Martin (born 1973), American football coach
- Demetrice Morley (born 1987), American gridiron football player
- Demetrice Webb or Dee Webb (born 1984), American football player

== See also ==
- Demetric
