= Dana Lee Dembrow =

American lawyer, legislator, and jurist

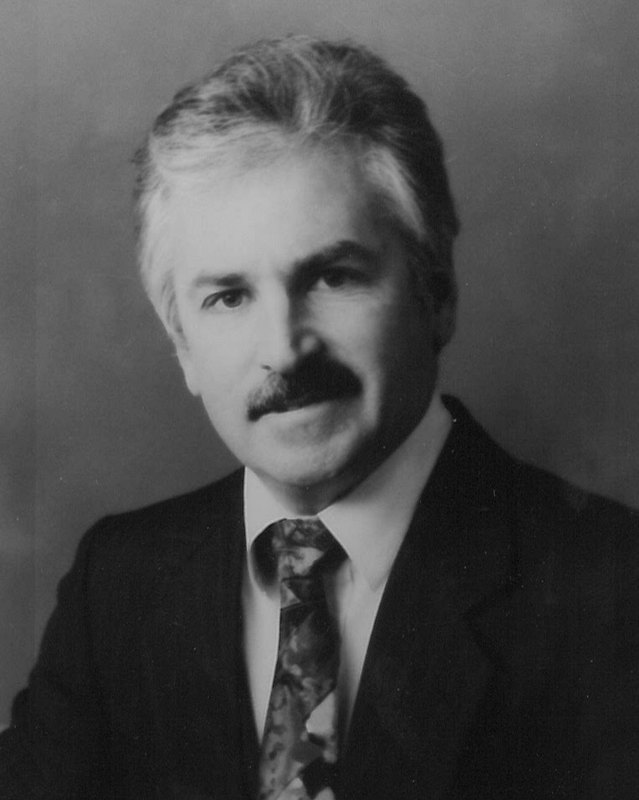

Member of the Maryland House of Delegates from the 20th district
- In office January 14, 1987 – January 8, 2003 Serving with Peter Franchot, Sheila E. Hixson
- Succeeded by: Gareth E. Murray

Personal details
- Born: September 29, 1953 (age 73) Washington, DC
- Party: Democratic
- Spouse: Suzette Dembrow (m. 1987; died 2006)
- Children: Two daughters
- Education: Springbrook High School, Silver Spring, Maryland, 1971
- Alma mater: Duke University, B.A., cum laude, 1975; George Washington University Law School, J.D., 1980
- Profession: Attorney

Dana Lee Dembrow (born September 29, 1953) is an American lawyer, legislator, and jurist who served four terms in the Maryland General Assembly.

== Early life and education ==
Dembrow was born in Washington, DC and grew up in Silver Spring, Maryland. He attended public school in Montgomery County and graduated from Springbrook High School in 1971. He received his B.A. in 1975 from Duke University, where he graduated cum laude with a double major in political science and psychology and also obtained a varsity letter. Dembrow earned his J.D. in 1980 from George Washington University Law School, where he served as Editor-in-Chief of the Advocate and in 1979 was named the recipient of the George Washington Award. Dembrow also completed the Washington Semester Political Science Honors Program of the American University, and spent a portion of his law school years at Georgetown University Law School, Notre Dame Law School, and the London School of Economics and Political Science.

== Career ==
Dembrow was admitted to the bars of the District of Columbia, Maryland, and West Virginia, licensed to practice in both state and federal courts. Dembrow clerked for the Honorable Peter Wolf in DC Superior Court before opening a law office in Washington, D.C., handling general litigation cases, first in D.C. and later in Maryland District and Circuit Courts.

In 1986, Dembrow, a Democrat, was elected to the State of Maryland legislature, one of three delegates representing the eastern portion of Montgomery County. He was re-elected delegate for Legislative District 20 in 1990.

In 1992 he ran unsuccessfully for a seat in the U.S. House of Representatives for Maryland's 4th Congressional District.

Dembrow was re-elected to the state legislature in 1994, and 1998. He served sixteen years in the General Assembly, and was appointed first to the standing committee on Constitutional and Administrative Law and later to the House Judiciary Committee, for which he chaired the Subcommittee on Civil Law and Procedure. He also held posts as Deputy Majority Whip, Chairman of the County Affairs Committee of the Montgomery Delegation, and Chairman of the Intergovernmental Affairs Committee of the Southern Legislative Conference.

Dembrow sponsored three adopted amendments to the Maryland Constitution which were ratified by statewide voter referendum, including the requirement of proportionate geographic representation on both of Maryland's Courts of Appeals. He also initiated and sponsored a number of proposals, now Maryland statutory law, for improvement to the mechanics of state governance. and a bill to regulate health insurance executive salaries.

Dembrow moved to Carroll County, Maryland in 2002, and filed a pro bono legal challenge that deferred the election of county commissioners at large rather than by district, and another to prohibit Christian-only prayer to open public meetings of the Carroll County Commissioners.

In April 2002 Dembrow and his wife Suzette were involved in a domestic incident as a result of which Dana was arrested under the state's newly enacted mandatory arrest law, which Dembrow had supported as a member of the House Judiciary Committee. The couple reconciled and Dembrow was acquitted of all charges, but the incident received significant negative press coverage. Dembrow was defeated in the next election.

In 2003 Denbrow obtained a position in the policy department of the Department of Juvenile Services.

In 2006 he was appointed as one of three administrative law judges which sit en banc as the Maryland State Board of Contract Appeals. He was re-appointed in 2009. He presided over cases and authored the opinions in a number of contract disputes and bid protests. In 2014 Dembrow was elected President of the Maryland Association of Administrative Law Judiciary (MAALJ).

In May 2016 Dembrow joined the government procurement division of the Maryland law firm Rifkin, Weiner, Livingston, Levitan, and Silver, LLC.

Dembrow was head of procurement for the Maryland Department of Health from May 2016 to November 2020. In December 2020 he said he had been forced to resign without explanation by then-Secretary Robert R. Neall a week before Neall retired. Responding to a General Assembly audit of pandemic-related emergency purchases by state agencies, state officials attributed the termination to unrelated performance issues, but auditors said that was not supported by documentation in personnel files.
