= Montgomery County Public Schools (Maryland) =

Public school district in Maryland, US

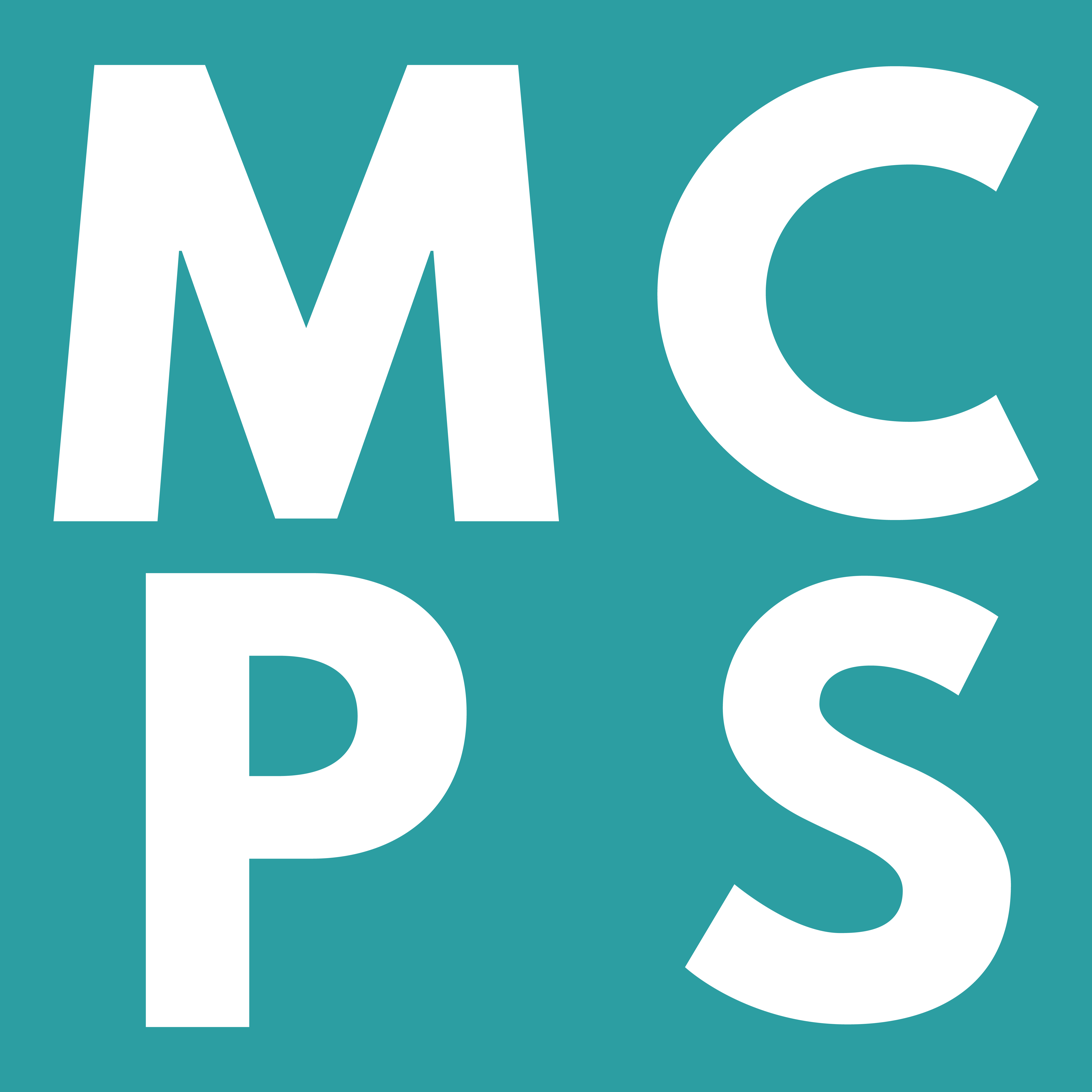

Address
- 15 W. Gude Drive Rockville, Montgomery, Maryland, 20850; United States
- Coordinates: 39°06′27″N 77°09′39″W

District information
- Type: Public
- Grades: Pre-K through 12 (including Head Start)
- Established: February 4, 1860; 166 years ago
- Superintendent: Thomas W. Taylor
- School board: Montgomery County Board of Education
- Chair of the board: President: Julie Yang; Vice President: Grace Rivera-Oven
- Governing agency: Maryland State Department of Education
- Schools: 211
- Budget: $3.60 billion (FY 2026)
- NCES District ID: 2400480

Students and staff
- Students: 159,671 (2024-25)
- Teachers: 13,994 (2022-23)
- Staff: 25,835 (2024-25)
- Student–teacher ratio: 13.68:1 (2023-24)

Other information
- Schedule: M-F except for county holidays
- Website: montgomeryschoolsmd.org

Montgomery County Public Schools (MCPS) is the public school district of Montgomery County, Maryland. With 211 schools, it is the largest school district in the state of Maryland. For the 2024-25 school year, the district had about 159,671 students taught by about 13,994 teachers, 86.4 percent of whom had a master's degree or equivalent. MCPS receives nearly half of Montgomery County’s budget—47.3% in fiscal year 2026.

As of July 2025, the superintendent of the district is Thomas W. Taylor. The board of education includes nine members, including the superintendent and a student member, who votes on all issues except punishment for individuals; in 2026–27, the student board member is Leul Dawit.

In 2010, MCPS was awarded a Malcolm Baldrige National Quality Award.

== History ==
=== 19th century ===
Only private schools existed in Montgomery County, Maryland, until 1860, when the public school district was established for white children. The outbreak of the Civil War the following year brought raids by both Union and Confederate forces on local schools, which ultimately closed from 1862 until 1864.

In 1872, the Maryland General Assembly appropriated state money to open schools for children of color. The county established a segregated school system.

In 1892, the county opened its first high school, Rockville High School, which graduated its first class of 12 seniors in 1897. (In 1927, Rockville Colored High School would open, after which the older whites-only school changed its name to Richard Montgomery High School.) A second high school, Gaithersburg High School, was established in 1904.

=== 20th century ===
In the early 20th century, the school budget started to see the effects of suburbanization. In 1908, there were 6,483 students and a budget of $76,000. The school system saw more growth in 1912 after the United States Congress passed a "non-resident" law that excluded Montgomery County school children from enrolling in Washington, D.C. schools, which were known for their higher quality. By 1921, the school budget had grown to more than $316,000.

The county's first Board of Education was named by legislative enactments in 1917; the first board consisted of nine men. A woman was appointed to the board in 1920: Mrs. A. Dawson Trumble, who served a five-year term that led to a steady succession of female members.

Edwin W. Broome, superintendent between 1916 and 1953, combined one-room schoolhouses into multi-room operations at the beginning of his tenure, reducing the number of schools from 108 to 66 by 1949. At that point, school enrollment was over 22,000. When Broome took the job, there were five high schools, all in the northern portion of the county. He built two secondary schools for Silver Spring and two for Bethesda, and also pushed high schools to add the 12th grade.

On December 8, 1936, William B. Gibbs Jr. petitioned the Board of Education to pay black educators the same salary as their white counterparts with the same qualifications, experience, and responsibilities. Gibbs stated that, as acting principal of Rockville Elementary School, he received a salary of $612 per year, while white educators with the same qualification and experience received $1,125 per year as a teacher and $1,475 per year as a principal. Gibbs petitioned the Board to pay him and other black educators the same salary as their white counterparts with back pay. Gibbs was represented by Thurgood Marshall and Charles Hamilton Houston, NAACP attorneys. The Board of Education decided not to grant the petition. On December 31, Gibbs and the NAACP filed a petition in the Circuit Court stating that salary differentials based on the educators' race are against the laws of Maryland and violate the Equal Protection Clause of the Fourteenth Amendment to the United States Constitution. They asked the court for a writ of mandamus to require the Board of Education to pay equal salaries to black and white educators with comparable qualifications, experience, and responsibilities. The court refused the Board of Education's request to throw out the case. Two weeks later, the Board of Education settled the case out of court. The Board agreed to establish a salary schedule without regard to race, creed, color, or whether they worked at a white school or a black school. They also agreed to give each current black teacher a salary increase equal to half of the difference between their salary and the comparable salary for a white teacher and then the other half one year later. (Note: Six months later, black teachers in Virginia sued to receive the same salaries as comparable white teachers, and they were represented by NAACP lawyers as well.)

In the early 1950s, elementary students of color attended one of four elementary schools – Linden, Ken-Gar, Takoma Park, and River Road – all of which were considered substandard. Older students of color attended Lincoln Junior High School and George Washington Carver High School in Rockville. Montgomery County was one of the first seven counties in Maryland to start to desegregate its public schools, which it began in September 1955, following the Brown v. Board of Education ruling by the Supreme Court of the United States, which ordered the desegregation of all schools nationwide. Montgomery County completed the integration of its schools in 1960–1961.

In 1961, the school system had 85,000 students and a $70 million budget, having become the largest system in the Washington suburbs. Prior to 1961, separate schools were maintained for black children. At that time, Rockville's George Washington Carver High School students were rezoned to the previously all-white schools across the county.

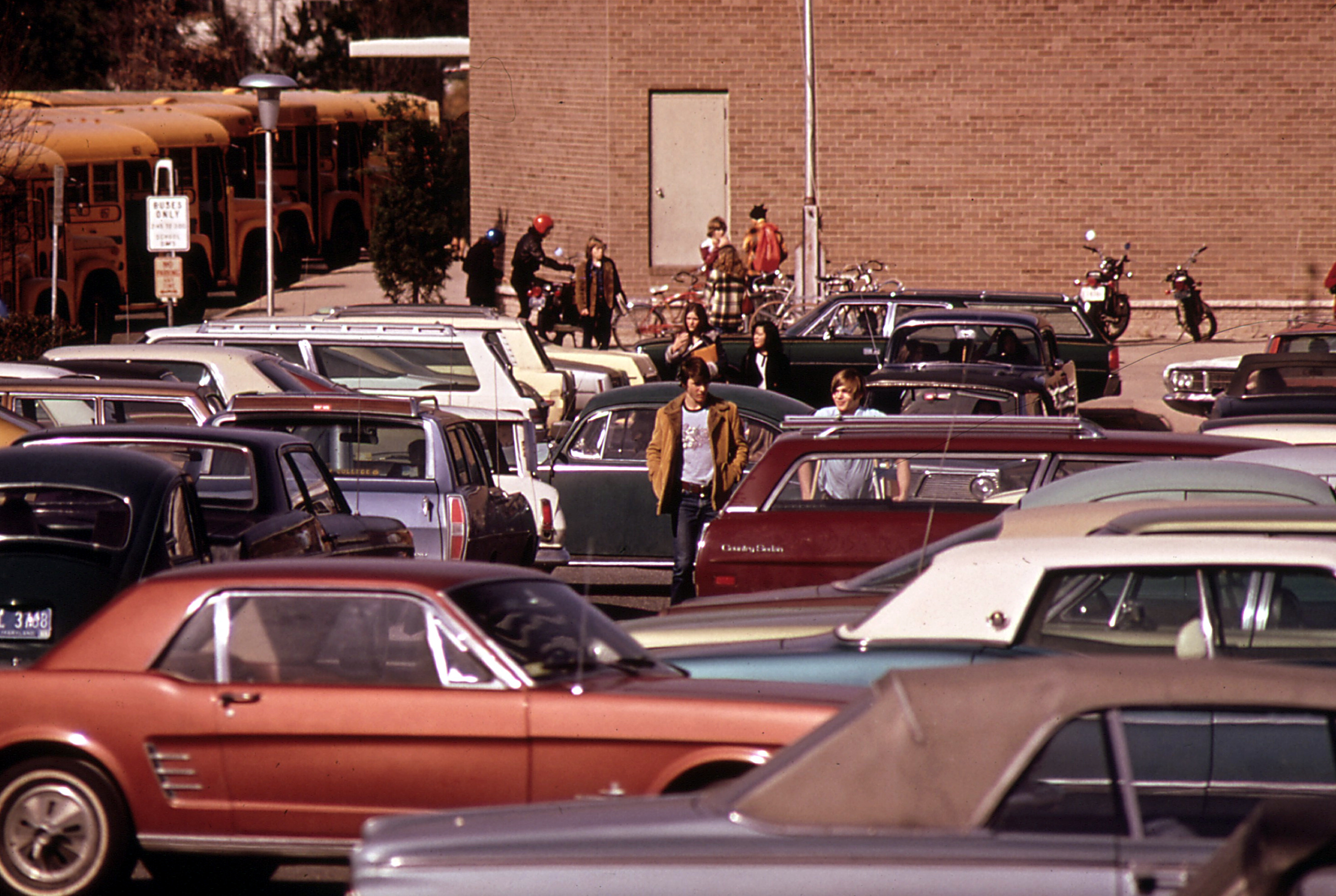
The parking lot at Woodward High School in Bethesda, Maryland, in May 1973, seen from the U.S. National Archives

MCPS saw enrollment numbers peak in 1972 when they reached 127,912. However, enrollment decreased over the next ten years, hitting a low of 91,030 in 1983. This prompted the closure of 60 schools. However, with more than 96,000 students and 13,000 staff members in 155 schools in 1986, the school system was still one of the 20 largest in the nation. Enrollment was over 100,000 by 1990.

In 1982, Odessa Shannon became the first elected black woman to serve on the Montgomery County School Board. 1991, Paul L. Vance became the county's first black superintendent when there were 107,000 students and 174 schools. When he left in 1999, MCPS had 129,000 students in 185 schools. Over the next ten years, enrollment grew to more than 150,000.

=== 21st century ===
In 2014, the board modified the school calendar to remove all references to the Christian and Jewish religious holidays of Christmas, Easter, Yom Kippur, and Rosh Hashanah. The amendment was in response to a campaign by the initiative "Equality for Eid" (E4E), which sought for Montgomery County Public School closures on the Muslim holidays of Eid al-Fitr and Eid al-Adha. The amendment received some media attention. Criticism of the amendment came from a variety of sources, including Montgomery County Executive Isiah Leggett and Congressman John Delaney.

For the 2022–2023 school year, the district has 210 schools and an enrollment of 160,554 students.

On February 2, 2024, Monifa McKnight, the first black woman to serve as superintendent of Montgomery County schools, resigned under pressure from the school board "amid questions about how the district handled sexual harassment, bullying and other allegations involving a former principal," according to the Washington Post.

== Governance and budget ==
MCPS funding comes mostly from Montgomery County (66%) and the State of Maryland (27%), with additional funds from federal government grants (3%), enterprise funds (3%), and other sources (1%).

MCPS, which covers the entire county as its school district, is governed by a board of education that sets goals, establishes policies, and allocates resources.

In 1977, the Maryland General Assembly amended Section 3-901 of the Education Article of the Annotated Code of the Public General Laws of Maryland to create a seat for a student on the eight-member board of education with a one-year term. From 1978 until 1982, a small representative assembly of students selected the student member. The first was David Naimon, who served during the 1978–1979 school year. Traci Williams, who served during the 1980–1981 school year, was the first African American to serve as a student member. After Williams died in December 2008, the MCPS board released a declaration recognizing her effect on the county.

Since 1982, the student member has been directly elected by vote of all MCPS secondary students (i.e., those in middle and high schools). Kurt Hirsch, the first student member directly elected by secondary students, served during the 1982–1983 school year. During the 1989 session of the Maryland General Assembly, Section 3-901 was again amended and established a limited vote for the student member. In 1995, Charles McCullough was the first African American to be directly elected as a student member of the board, serving during the 1995–1996 school year.

Since 2016, the student member has had full voting rights, except for votes to punish people. The student member of the board serves one year and can vote on matters related to collective bargaining, capital and operating budgets, and school closings, re–openings, and boundaries. The student member of the board receives a college scholarship equivalent to the cost of one year at the University of Maryland, student service learning hours, and one honors-level social studies credit.

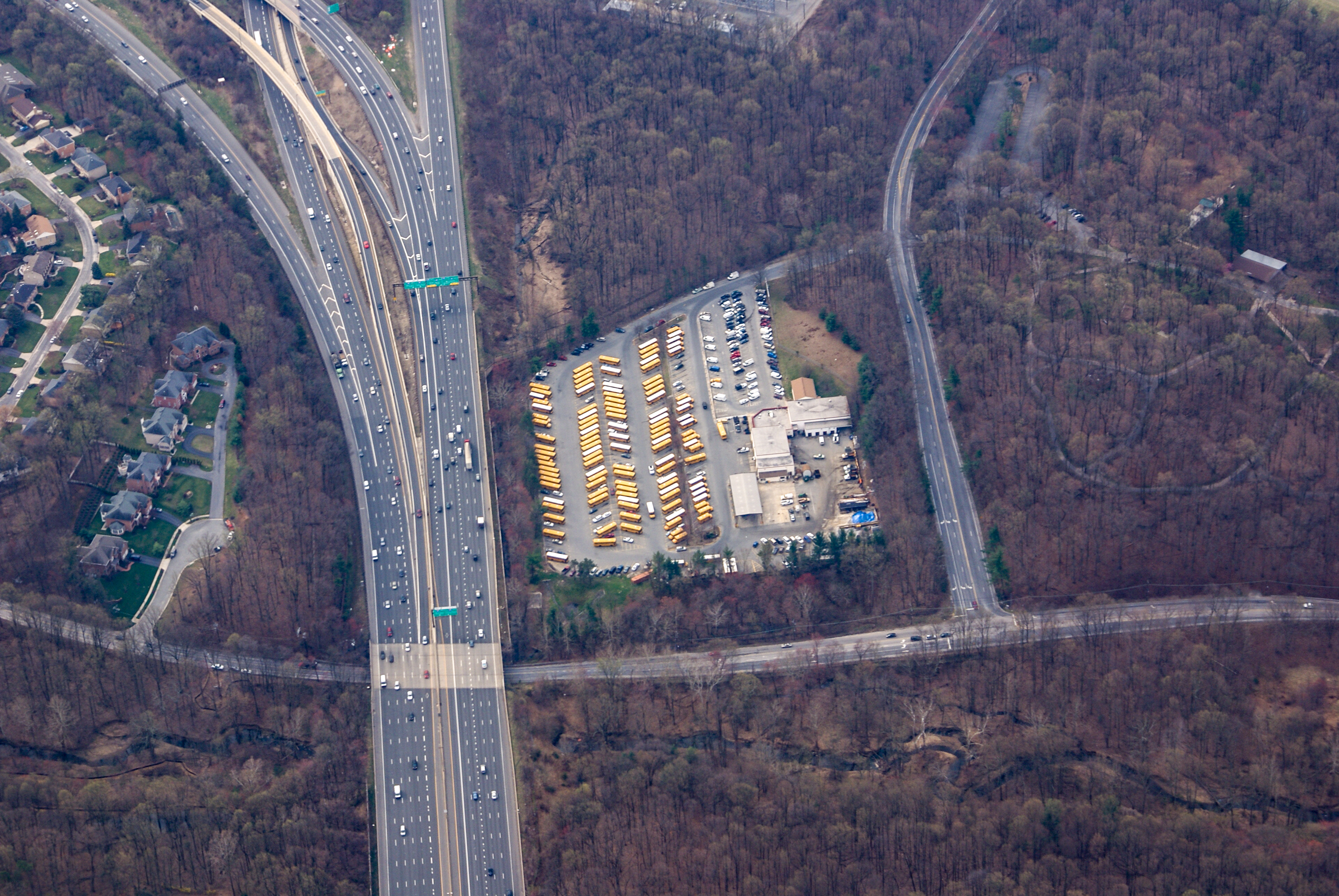
A Montgomery County Public Schools bus depot in Potomac, Maryland, in March 2010

The student member for the 2025–2026 school year is Anuva Maloo, a senior at Montgomery Blair High School. Of the 61,647 students who voted, Maloo received 62 percent of the vote. She was sworn in on July 1, 2025.

The board's current members are:

Name	District	Term ends
Brenda Wolff	District 5	2026
Karla Silvestre	At-large	2026
Grace Rivera-Oven	District 1	2026
Laura Stewart	District 4	2028
Rita Montoya	At-large	2028
Julie Yang	District 3, President	2026
Natalie Zimmerman	District 2	2028
Leul Dawit	Student Member	2027
Thomas W. Taylor	Superintendent	N/A

== Students ==
The MCPS student population has continued to grow over the years. The district saw a record enrollment of 160,564 students at the start of the 2022–23 school year. MCPS serves a diverse student body, with 32.8% Hispanic, 25.8% White, 21.8% Black, 14.3% Asian, .1% Native Hawaiian or other Pacific Islander, and 5.0% two or more races.

Graduates from the class of 2018 earned $364 million in college scholarships, an increase of more than $14 million over the previous year.

The class of 2017 outperformed their peers in the state of Maryland, and the nation as a whole, on Advanced Placement (AP) exams, based on AP Cohort Results released by the College Board. In 2017, more than 7,000 MCPS graduates (66%) took one or more AP exams. The percentage of students receiving a college-ready score of 3 or higher on at least one exam rose to 52%, higher than the 31% of the public school graduates in Maryland and 23% of the national graduates.

The total number of AP tests taken declined from 41,048 in 2019 to 31,750 in 2021. Passing scores increased from 71.5% in 2019 to 75.1% in 2020; however, they declined again in 2021 to 68.1%.

The class of 2024 saw a 91.8% four-year graduation rate, an increase of 2.2% from the previous year.

== Academics ==
MCPS has established certain criteria for students to graduate high school. Students must achieve 22 credits to graduate, with each semester course worth 0.5 credits. The necessary credits include, among others, the following requirements for the class of 2025:

- 4 credits — English
- 4 credits — Math: At least 1 Algebra and 1 Geometry
- 3 credits — Science: At least 1 Life science (e.g., Biology) and 1 Physical science
- 3 credits — Social studies: 1 credit each of Government, U.S. history, and World history
- 1 credit — Technology: Students can choose among Computer Science, Engineering, or other technology-related courses
- Other credit requirements include: Physical Education, Health Education, Fine Arts, and Electives

In addition to these credit requirements, other requirements for graduation include four years of enrollment, student service learning (SSL) hours, and state assessments.

During the 2017–18 school year, the district launched data dashboards to focus on learning, accountability, and results. Continuous monitoring of students' progress ensures that students have timely support, focused interventions, acceleration, and enrichment. Readiness data helps the district to monitor students' progress and plan accordingly.

The district has emphasized preparing students for both college and career. In April 2018, the College Board and Project Lead the Way awarded more than 3,000 students in the U.S. for their accomplishments in the 2016–17 school year. Compared to other school districts, MCPS had the most students who'd earned the AP + PLTW Student Achievements, followed by districts in Illinois and Texas, and its neighboring Howard County Public School System in Maryland. Wheaton High School, which focuses on project-based learning, had the second-most students with the achievement, behind Adlai E. Stevenson High School in Illinois.

Every high school offers courses linked to a variety of careers. A program implemented at Magruder High School during the 2018–19 school year allows students to get a head start on careers in aviation.

In May 2018, students from Northwest High School were the first in the district to graduate with a two-year degree in general engineering from Montgomery College as well as a high school diploma. In May 2018, five Northwood High School students were the first MCPS students to complete the Middle College Program at their school, which allowed them to earn an associate degree from Montgomery College as well as a high school diploma.

MCPS is one of the school districts in the nation that offers services at the elementary, middle, and high school levels for twice-exceptional students. Twice-exceptional students have a profile of significant strengths and weaknesses—they are gifted and talented and also meet the criteria for an Individualized Education Program (IEP) or a Section 504 plan. Twice-exceptional students access accelerated and enriched instruction with appropriate support and services at their local school, a magnet/choice program, or a special education discrete service.

Language immersion programs are offered at several elementary and middle schools.

== Schools ==
MCPS consists of 211 schools: 137 elementary schools, 40 middle schools, 26 high schools, 5 special schools, 1 early childhood learning center, and 1 alternative education program.

MCPS publishes school data annually. Its "Schools at a Glance" document provides information about enrollment, staffing, facilities, programs, outcome measures, and personnel costs for each school.

The district has 39 National Blue Ribbon Schools, a designation that recognizes public and private schools based on their overall academic excellence or their progress in closing achievement gaps among student subgroups.

The school system piloted an extended school year at two elementary schools – Arcola and Roscoe Nix elementary schools – during the 2018–2019 school year. The plan aims to help economically disadvantaged students, who lose the most ground during long summer breaks. As of 2022, the program is still in effect at these schools. The school began July 6 for the 2022–2023 school year, giving students an additional 30 days of school. The county says this extended schedule provides students interactive learning and social/emotional growth.

=== High schools ===
Name	Location	Principal	Mascot	Namesake
Bethesda-Chevy Chase High School	Bethesda	La Faye E. Howard	Barons	
Montgomery Blair High School	Four Corners	Damon A. Monteleone	Blazers	Postmaster General Montgomery Blair
James Hubert Blake High School	Cloverly	Ahmed Adelekan	Bengals	Musician James Hubert Blake
Winston Churchill High School	Potomac	John W. Taylor	Bulldogs	British Prime Minister Winston Churchill
Clarksburg High School	Clarksburg	Anita R. O'Neill	Coyotes	
Damascus High School	Damascus	Bradley W. Rohner	Hornets	
Thomas Edison High School of Technology (10-12)	Wheaton	Pamela W. Krawczel	Wizards	Inventor Thomas Edison
Albert Einstein High School	Kensington	Mark Brown Jr.	Titans	scientist Albert Einstein
Gaithersburg High School	Gaithersburg	Brittany T. Love-Campbell	Trojans	
Walter Johnson High School	North Bethesda	Nicole J. Morgan	Wildcats	Baseball player Walter Perry Johnson
John F. Kennedy High School	Glenmont	Karla L. Lopez-Arias	Cavaliers	President John F. Kennedy
Col. Zadok Magruder High School	Rockville	Christopher J. Ascienzo	Colonels	Colonel Zadok Magruder
Richard Montgomery High School	Rockville	Alicia M. Deeny	Rockets	General Richard Montgomery
Northwest High School	Germantown	Nyurka Morales (acting)	Jaguars	
Northwood High School	Silver Spring	Jonathan L. Garrick	Gladiators	
Paint Branch High School	Burtonsville	Shawaan T. Robinson	Panthers	
Poolesville High School	Poolesville	Mark A. Carothers	Falcons	
Quince Orchard High School	Gaithersburg	Irina LaGrange	Cougars	
Rockville High School	Rockville	Rhoshanda M. Pyles	Rams	
Seneca Valley High School	Germantown	Ricardo E. Hernandez	Eagles	
Sherwood High School	Sandy Spring	Micah E. Wiggins	Warriors	
Springbrook High School	White Oak	Aaron Shin	Blue Devils	
Watkins Mill High School	Gaithersburg	Vilma C. Najera	Wolverines	
Wheaton High School	Wheaton	Pamela W. Krawczel	Knights	
Walt Whitman High School	Bethesda	Gregory Miller	Vikings	Poet Walt Whitman
Thomas S. Wootton High School	North Potomac	Joseph D. Bostic	Patriots	Founder of Montgomery County, Thomas Sprigg Wootton

== Sports ==
MCPS offers a variety of sports — 10 sports during the fall, 7 during the winter, and 8 during the spring. MCPS also offers corollary sports (pickleball, bocce ball, and allied softball), which aims to increase sports opportunities for a wider variety of students, in particular students with disabilities.

== Notable alumni ==
Prominent graduates or former attendees of the school system include:

- Tori Amos, singer
- Michelle Bachelet, 33rd and 35th president of Chile
- Jonathan Banks, actor
- Lewis Black, comedian
- Carl Bernstein, journalist
- Mark Bryan, musician
- Dave Chappelle, comedian
- Connie Chung, journalist
- Darnell Docket, football player
- Michael Ealy, actor
- Katie Feeney, social media personality
- Dean Felber, musician
- John Harwood, journalist
- Goldie Hawn, actress
- Dan Heillie, TV anchor
- John Michael Higgins, actor
- Thomas Jane, actor
- Joan Jett, singer
- Spike Jonze, director/screenwriter
- Logic, rapper
- Mia Khalifa, media personality
- Helen Maroulis, Olympic gold medalist
- Paula Marshall, actress
- Shervin Pishevar, entrepreneur
- Curtis Pride, baseball player
- Giuliana Rancic, media personality
- Irvin Smith, football player
- Sylvester Stallone, actor
- Darren Star, television and film writer
- Brian Stelter, journalist
- Daniel Stern, actor
- Rebecca Sugar, creator of TV show Steven Universe
- Scott Van Pelt, TV anchor
- Wale, rapper
- Sean Whalen, actor
- Frederick Yeh, biologist
- Siribha Chudabhorn, princess of Thailand
