= Cloverly, Maryland =

- Census-designated place
- Location of Cloverly, Maryland
- Coordinates: 39°07′15″N 77°00′32″W
- Country: United States
- State: Maryland
- County: Montgomery

Area
  - Total: 10.10 sq mi (26.16 km^{2})
  - Land: 10.07 sq mi (26.07 km^{2})
  - Water: 0.035 sq mi (0.09 km^{2})
- Elevation: 515 ft (157 m)

Population (2020)
  - Total: 15,285
  - Density: 1,518.7/sq mi (586.37/km^{2})
- Time zone: UTC−5 (Eastern (EST))
  - Summer (DST): UTC−4 (EDT)
- ZIP code: 20905
- Area codes: 301, 240
- FIPS code: 24-18150
- GNIS feature ID: 2389336

Cloverly is an unincorporated town and census-designated place in Montgomery County, Maryland, United States. Its population was 15,285 as of the 2020 census.

== Geography ==
As an unincorporated area, Cloverly's boundaries are not officially defined. Cloverly is, however, recognized by the United States Census Bureau as a census-designated place, and by the United States Geological Survey as a populated place.

According to the United States Census Bureau, the place has a total area of 3.9 square miles (10 km^{2}), all land.

The commercial center of Cloverly lies at the intersection of New Hampshire Avenue (MD Route 650) and Briggs Chaney Road.

== Demographics ==
Historical population
Census	Pop.	Note	%±
2000	7,835		—
2010	15,126		93.1%
2020	15,285		1.1%
U.S. Decennial Census; 2010–2020

=== Racial and ethnic composition ===
Cloverly CDP, Maryland – Racial and ethnic composition Note: the US Census treats Hispanic/Latino as an ethnic category. This table excludes Latinos from the racial categories and assigns them to a separate category. Hispanics/Latinos may be of any race.
Race / Ethnicity (NH = Non-Hispanic)	Pop 2000	Pop 2010	Pop 2020	% 2000	% 2010	% 2020
White alone (NH)	4,624	6,392	5,144	59.02%	42.26%	33.65%
Black or African American alone (NH)	1,480	3,801	4,032	18.89%	25.13%	26.38%
Native American or Alaska Native alone (NH)	23	31	20	0.29%	0.20%	0.13%
Asian alone (NH)	1,096	2,742	2,703	13.99%	18.13%	17.68%
Native Hawaiian or Pacific Islander alone (NH)	0	9	14	0.00%	0.06%	0.09%
Other race alone (NH)	22	53	148	0.28%	0.35%	0.97%
Mixed race or Multiracial (NH)	188	479	828	2.40%	3.17%	5.42%
Hispanic or Latino (any race)	402	1,619	2,396	5.13%	10.70%	15.68%
Total	7,835	15,126	15,285	100.00%	100.00%	100.00%

=== 2020 census ===
As of the 2020 census, Cloverly had a population of 15,285. The median age was 44.5 years. 20.7% of residents were under the age of 18 and 20.5% of residents were 65 years of age or older. For every 100 females there were 95.4 males, and for every 100 females age 18 and over there were 92.5 males age 18 and over.

100.0% of residents lived in urban areas, while 0.0% lived in rural areas.

There were 4,913 households in Cloverly, of which 33.5% had children under the age of 18 living in them. Of all households, 68.5% were married-couple households, 9.1% were households with a male householder and no spouse or partner present, and 19.6% were households with a female householder and no spouse or partner present. About 13.2% of all households were made up of individuals and 7.9% had someone living alone who was 65 years of age or older.

There were 5,015 housing units, of which 2.0% were vacant. The homeowner vacancy rate was 0.6% and the rental vacancy rate was 2.3%.

=== 2000 census ===
At the 2000 census there were 7,835 people in 2,492 households, including 2,113 families, in the CDP. The population density was 2,004.7 inhabitants per square mile (774.0/km^{2}). There were 2,540 housing units at an average density of 649.9 per square mile (250.9/km^{2}). The racial makeup of the area was 61.52% White, 19.13% African American, 0.40% Native American, 14.05% Asian, 1.98% from other races, and 2.92% from two or more races. Hispanic or Latino of any race were 5.13%.

Of the 2,492 households 43.7% had children under the age of 18 living with them, 71.4% were married couples living together, 9.8% had a female householder with no husband present, and 15.2% were non-families. 12.0% of households were one person and 3.6% were one person aged 65 or older. The average household size was 3.14 and the average family size was 3.41.

The age distribution was 29.0% under the age of 18, 7.4% from 18 to 24, 25.5% from 25 to 44, 29.2% from 45 to 64, and 8.9% 65 or older. The median age was 39 years. For every 100 females, there were 98.0 males. For every 100 females age 18 and over, there were 93.3 males.

The median household income was $82,544 and the median family income was $88,370. Males had a median income of $51,377 versus $40,972 for females. The per capita income for the area was $31,123. About 2.5% of families and 3.4% of the population were below the poverty line, including 3.6% of those under age 18 and none of those age 65 or over.

== Education ==
Montgomery County Public Schools operates public schools.

Public schools for the area include Cloverly Elementary (which lies in the town), Briggs Chaney Middle, and the three high schools of the Northeast Consortium: James Hubert Blake High School, Paint Branch High School, and Springbrook High School.

Only Blake is within the Cloverly CDP.

== Religion ==
As of 2019 the community has 32 religious institutions. It includes Christian, Ahmadi Muslim, and Jain institutions.
