= Charles McCullough (judge) =

British barrister and judge

Sir Iain Charles Robert McCullough (31 July 1931 – 9 October 2018) was a British barrister and judge. He was a judge of the High Court of Justice (Queen's Bench Division) from 1981 to 1998.

In 1996, he sentenced Owen Oyston to six years in prison for rape.

In 1997, he tried football players Bruce Grobbelaar, John Fashanu, Hans Segers, and Malaysian businessman Heng Suan Lim, who had been accusing of match fixing.

In retirement, McCullough was a Surveillance Commissioner from 1998 until 2009.

His son is the barrister Angus Maxwell Thomas McCullough KC.
