= Charles S. McCullough House =

Historic house in South Carolina, United States

- U.S. National Register of Historic Places
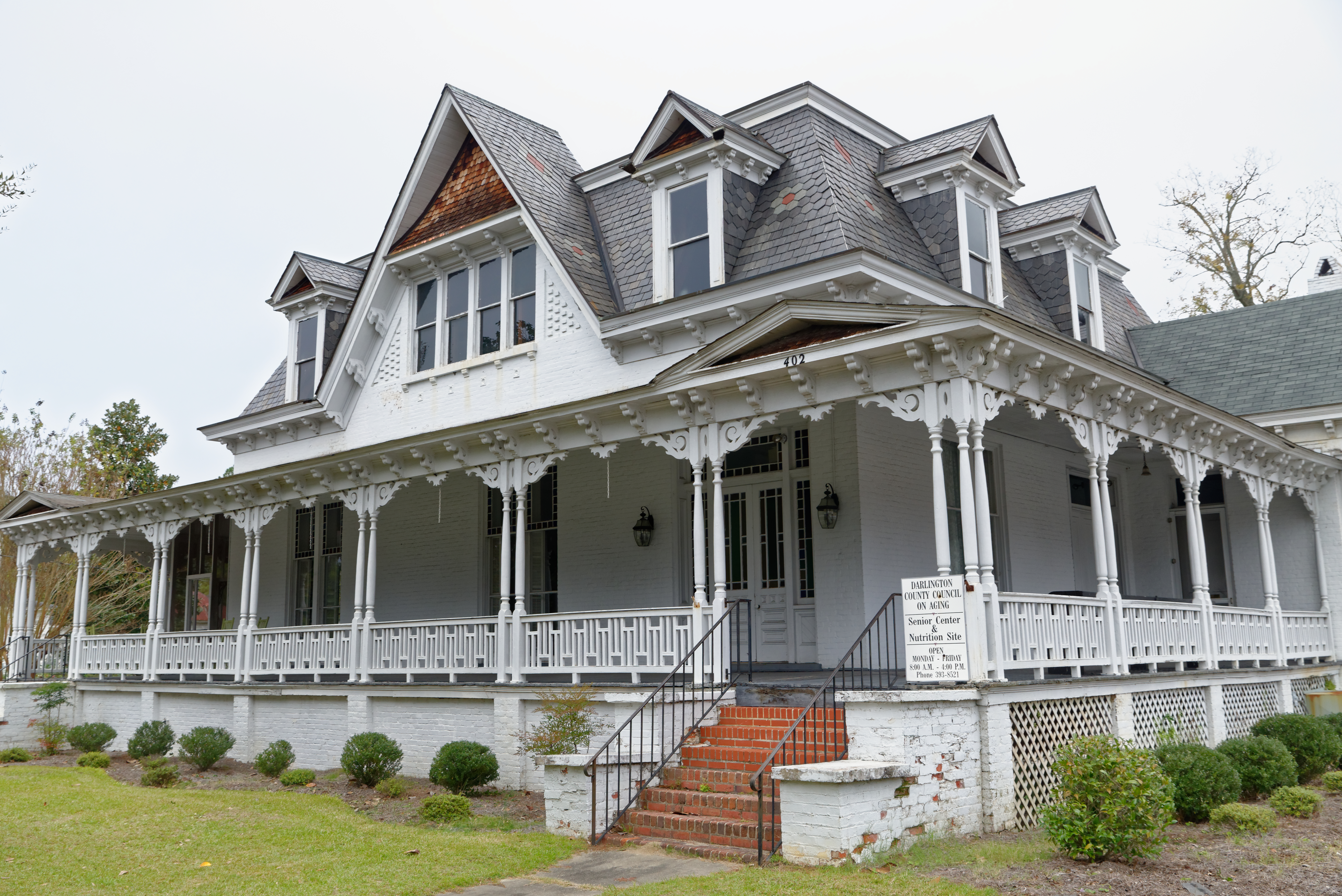

- Location within South Carolina Location within the United States
- Location: 480 Pearl St., Darlington, South Carolina
- Coordinates: 34°18′0″N 79°52′37″W
- Area: less than one acre
- Built: 1889
- Architectural style: Second Empire
- MPS: City of Darlington MRA
- NRHP reference No.: 88000060
- Added to NRHP: February 10, 1988

Charles S. McCullough House, also known as the Memorial Center, is a historic home located at Darlington, Darlington County, South Carolina. It was built in 1889, and is a 1 1/2-story, brick Second Empire style residence. It has a projecting one-story ell and a porch on three sides. The front porch has elaborate sawn brackets on paired turned posts and an ornamental balustrade. The front elevation features a steeply pitched gable, which rises above the top of the mansard roof.

It was listed on the National Register of Historic Places in 1988.
