= Charles A. McCullough II =

American politician and civil rights activist

Charles A. McCullough II Esquire
- Born: 1978 (age 47–48)
- Education: Pepperdine University; Boston College (Law); Boston College (Lynch GSE)
- Occupation: Attorney/Arbitrator

Charles McCullough (born 1978) is an American politician and civil rights activist. At age 16 he was the first African American directly elected student member of the Montgomery County, Maryland board of education. As a school board member, McCullough was an activist for LGBTQIA rights.

== Politics and activism ==
In 1995, McCullough became the first African American directly elected to serve as student member of the Board of Education (SMOB) of Montgomery County Public Schools (MCPS). McCullough received 25,923 (87%) of the 29,544 total votes cast. At the time of his election, MCPS comprised 117,000 students in 179 schools across 500 square miles.

As SMOB, McCullough had full voting rights on all policy matters and administrative hires. On the school board, McCullough was an advocate for LGBTQIA rights. He authored Resolution No. 240-1996 Human Relations Policy (Sexual Orientation and Inclusion). For several months between its proposal and adoption, protests occurred, and the policy was the subject of debate that received national media attention. In adopting the resolution, MCPS became one of the first school systems in the United States to establish a policy protecting LGBTQIA employees from discrimination. After its adoption the policy served as an example for school districts seeking to protect homosexuals from discrimination.

During McCullough's term he lobbied for the establishment of a SMOB scholarship, restored the MCPS middle school sports program, and defeated a proposal to implement a school bus fee.

In 1998, McCullough became the second African American to serve as president of the Pepperdine University Student Government Association. In this role he led a student protest movement resulting in the undergraduate college recognizing Martin Luther King Jr. Day.

In 2009, McCullough was elected to the board of directors of the United States Postal Service Federal Credit Union (USPSFCU). In 2014, at age 26, McCullough became chairman of the USPSFCU board of directors. During his time as chair, the credit union implemented new online banking services and opened a new branch location.

In 2017, McCullough announced his candidacy for the Arlington County Board running as a self-described progressive-independent candidate. Following the Charlottesville attack, McCullough called for the renaming of Jefferson Davis Highway, the section of Route 1 in Arlington County. McCullough received the endorsement of progressive political organizations including the Arlington Green Party and Working Families Party.

== Career ==
Educated at Boston College Law School and the Lynch Graduate School of Education, McCullough is admitted to practice law in the District of Columbia and the United States Supreme Court. McCullough has served Harvard University, US General Services Administration, District of Columbia Public Schools, National Board for Professional Teaching Standards, and the Australian government in a variety of in a variety of legal and policy-development capacities. McCullough was an Australian government representative at the 2012 International Education Summit on the Occasion of the G8.

McCullough is founder/principal of The Conglomerated McCullough Company LLC (CoMcCo). CoMcCo is a business providing software engineering and organizational management services.

== Selected bibliography ==
- “United States Education Guidebook”, DIISRTE, Government of Australia, 2012
- “It All Started at Pine Ridge—But It Didn’t End There…”, NIEA News Vol. 41, Iss. 1, NIEA, 2009
- “It All Started at Pine Ridge… The True Story of Getting Certified”, NIEA News Vol. 40, Iss. 2, NIEA, 2008
- “The Assize of Education: Codifying the Public Purpose of Education to Improve Urban School District Reform Efforts”, NJUEP, Vol. 1, No. 2, Fall, Texas Southern Univ., 2007
- “What Matters Even More: Codifying the Public Purpose of Education to Meet the Education Reform Challenges of the New Millennium”, B.C. Third World L.J., Vol 27, Iss. 1, Art. 3, Boston College, 2007
- “Honorable David S. Nelson: A Biography”, GYRO Colloquium, Boston College, 2002
