= Demetric Austin =

American basketball player

Personal information
- Born: January 1, 1995 (age 31) Washington, D.C., U.S.
- Listed height: 6 ft 7 in (2.01 m)
- Listed weight: 235 lb (107 kg)

Career information
- High school: Springbrook (Silver Spring, Maryland)
- College: Dillard (2015–2017)
- NBA draft: 2017: undrafted
- Playing career: 2017–2020
- Position: Power forward

Career history
- 2017–2018: Barreirense
- 2018: Pertevniyal
- 2018–2019: Panionios
- 2019–2020: SOMB
- 2020: Sporting CP

Demetric Austin (born January 1, 1995) is an American professional basketball player. Standing at 2.01 m (6 ft 7 in), he plays the power forward position. After two years at Dillard University, Austin entered the 2017 NBA draft but was not selected in the draft's two rounds.

== High school career ==
Austin played high school basketball at Springbrook High School, in Silver Spring, Maryland.

== College career ==
After graduating from Springbrook High School, Austin played college basketball for the Dillard University from 2015 to 2017.

== Playing career ==
After going undrafted in the 2017 NBA draft Austin started his professional career with Barreirense of the Portuguese LPB. With Barreirense, he averaged 19.4 points and 7.9 rebounds per game.

After his first pro year, Austin joined Pertevniyal in Turkey.

On December 13, 2018, he left the club and joined Panionios of the Greek Basket League until the end of the season. On August 31, 2019, Austin renewed his contract with Panionios. Three days later, he was unexpectedly released due to having to attend to a serious personal matter in the United States.

On February 7, 2020, he joined Sporting CP, team of the Portuguese Basketball League. Twenty five days later, he left the club.

== Personal life ==
When he was 10 years old, Austin became a victim of a gunshot wound. After the incident, Austin was afraid to go outside due to the gunshot. His fear came to an end after attending at the Springbrook High School.
