= Crashletes =

- Genre: Sports
- Directed by: Michael Simon
- Presented by: Rob Gronkowski; Brandon Broady; Stevie Nelson
- Country of origin: United States
- Original language: English
- No. of seasons: 3
- No. of episodes: 60

Production
- Executive producers: Rob Dyrdek; Shane Nickerson; Matt Harris
- Producer: Henry Penzi
- Running time: 22 minutes
- Production companies: Superjacket Productions; Nickelodeon Productions

Original release
- Network: Nickelodeon; CBS All Access
- Release: July 5, 2016 – December 15, 2020

Crashletes is an American sports television program that premiered on Nickelodeon on July 5, 2016. The program is hosted by Rob Gronkowski, Brandon Broady, and Stevie Nelson.

== Premise ==
Brandon and Stevie, along with a guest host from the world of sports (e.g. basketball player DeAndre Jordan, snowboarder Shaun White, Olympic gymnast Laurie Hernandez, etc.) and an audience of kids, react to various viral videos of people failing at sports, which they call "crashletes." Each clip is shown in a package of about four to seven clips, and a recurring segment is the Crashdown (formerly known as the Gronkdown when Gronkowski was host), where a top 5 list of clips under a certain theming is shown.

== Production ==
Crashletes was renewed for a second season on September 1, 2016, and the second season premiered on September 16, 2016. Following a silent renewal, the third season was announced to premiere on TeenNick on February 11, 2018, but new episodes did not air in February 2018. On January 25, 2019, it was announced that the third season would premiere on February 3, 2019. The final ten episodes of the third season were released on CBS All Access on December 15, 2020.

== Episodes ==
=== Series overview ===
| Season | Episodes | | Originally released | | |
| Season | Episodes | | First released | Last released | Network |
|---|---|---|---|---|---|
| 1 | 19 | | July 5, 2016 | September 9, 2016 | Nickelodeon |
| 2 | 21 | | September 16, 2016 | April 23, 2017 | Nickelodeon |
| 3 | 20 | 10 | February 3, 2019 | May 3, 2019 | Nickelodeon |
| 3 | 20 | 10 | December 15, 2020 | | CBS All Access |

=== Season 1 (2016) ===
| No. overall | No. in season | Title | Original release date | Prod. code | U.S. viewers (millions) |
|---|---|---|---|---|---|
| 1 | 1 | "False Starts" | July 5, 2016 | 101 | 1.44 |
| 2 | 2 | "Spring Breakers" | July 6, 2016 | 110 | 1.15 |
| 3 | 3 | "Heads Up!" | July 7, 2016 | 114 | 1.16 |
| 4 | 4 | "Truck Stick" | July 8, 2016 | 115 | 0.93 |
| 5 | 5 | "Gimmes" | July 11, 2016 | 108 | 1.15 |
| 6 | 6 | "Agony of Defeat" | July 12, 2016 | 107 | 1.03 |
| 7 | 7 | "Crashlete's Foot" | July 13, 2016 | 104 | 1.36 |
| 8 | 8 | "Partial Arts" | July 14, 2016 | 113 | 1.38 |
| 9 | 9 | "You Got Served!" | July 15, 2016 | 111 | 1.04 |
| 10 | 10 | "Rookie Mistakes" | July 18, 2016 | 102 | 1.06 |
| 11 | 11 | "Premature Celebrations" | July 19, 2016 | 103 | 1.05 |
| 12 | 12 | "Slammed Dunks" | July 20, 2016 | 105 | 1.02 |
| 13 | 13 | "Formula None" | July 21, 2016 | 116 | 1.05 |
| 14 | 14 | "The Gronk Down" | July 22, 2016 | 109 | N/A |
| 15 | 15 | "Lil Goons" | July 25, 2016 | 117 | 1.05 |
| 16 | 16 | "Duncles" | July 26, 2016 | 118 | 1.26 |
| 17 | 17 | "Friday Night Cat Fights" | July 27, 2016 | 120 | 1.25 |
| 18 | 18 | "Snow Pain No Gain" | July 28, 2016 | 119 | 0.99 |
| 19 | 19 | "Eaton It" | September 9, 2016 | 106 | 1.14 |

=== Season 2 (2016–17) ===
| No. overall | No. in season | Title | Original release date | Prod. code | U.S. viewers (millions) |
|---|---|---|---|---|---|
| 20 | 1 | "Gym Nasty" | September 16, 2016 | 203 | 1.22 |
| 21 | 2 | "Gronk Did It!" | September 23, 2016 | 205 | 1.05 |
| 22 | 3 | "Need for Speed" | September 30, 2016 | 202 | 0.98 |
| 23 | 4 | "Seriously Bro?" | October 7, 2016 | 112 | 1.02 |
| 24 | 5 | "Thrills and Spills" | October 17, 2016 | 214 | 1.01 |
| 25 | 6 | "Hype Machines" | October 24, 2016 | 204 | 0.88 |
| 26 | 7 | "That's Gotta Hurdle" | November 7, 2016 | 201 | 1.25 |
| 27 | 8 | "You Make the Call" | November 14, 2016 | 207 | 1.09 |
| 28 | 9 | "Animal Interference" | January 8, 2017 | 211 | 0.97 |
| 29 | 10 | "Tackling Dummies with Von Miller" | January 15, 2017 | 215 | 0.84 |
| 30 | 11 | "Cheaters" | January 22, 2017 | 212 | 0.90 |
| 31 | 12 | "Protein Shakes" | January 29, 2017 | 220 | 0.99 |
| 32 | 13 | "Ramp-age with Tony Hawk" | February 19, 2017 | 219 | 0.93 |
| 33 | 14 | "Posterized with Andre Drummond" | February 26, 2017 | 217 | 1.16 |
| 34 | 15 | "Sibling Rivalries" | March 5, 2017 | 209 | 0.78 |
| 35 | 16 | "Ally Oops with Nick Young" | March 19, 2017 | 216 | 0.95 |
| 36 | 17 | "Mini-Monsters" | March 26, 2017 | 210 | 1.02 |
| 37 | 18 | "Born to Crash" | April 2, 2017 | 213 | 1.08 |
| 38 | 19 | "Walk It Off" "Worst Records" | April 9, 2017 | 206 | 0.92 |
| 39 | 20 | "Just Kickin' It" | April 16, 2017 | 208 | 0.81 |
| 40 | 21 | "Instaslam" | April 23, 2017 | 218 | 0.93 |

=== Season 3 (2019–20) ===
| No. overall | No. in season | Title | Original release date | Prod. code | U.S. viewers (millions) |
|---|---|---|---|---|---|
Part 1: Nickelodeon
| 41 | 1 | "Gurley Girls" | February 3, 2019 | 313 | 0.60 |
| 42 | 2 | "Crash Phrases" | February 8, 2019 | 309 | 0.75 |
| 43 | 3 | "Synchronized Stinking" | February 22, 2019 | 320 | 0.75 |
| 44 | 4 | "Ramped Up" | March 1, 2019 | 314 | 0.72 |
| 45 | 5 | " 'Extra' Effort" | March 29, 2019 | 306 | 0.73 |
| 46 | 6 | "Dunk Yard" | April 5, 2019 | 305 | 0.66 |
| 47 | 7 | "CRASHCAR" | April 12, 2019 | 302 | 0.72 |
| 48 | 8 | "Doc Hawk" | April 19, 2019 | 319 | 0.69 |
| 49 | 9 | "Poor Sport" | April 26, 2019 | 311 | 0.57 |
| 50 | 10 | "Hero to Zero" | May 3, 2019 | 301 | 0.49 |
Part 2: CBS All Access
| 51 | 11 | "Crashletes on Ice" | December 15, 2020 | 303 | N/A |
| 52 | 12 | "Girls vs. Boys" | December 15, 2020 | TBA | N/A |
| 53 | 13 | "Trash-letes" | December 15, 2020 | TBA | N/A |
| 54 | 14 | "De-Fence" | December 15, 2020 | TBA | N/A |
| 55 | 15 | "C-Mojis" | December 15, 2020 | TBA | N/A |
| 56 | 16 | "Altitude Sickness" | December 15, 2020 | TBA | N/A |
| 57 | 17 | "Crash Course" | December 15, 2020 | 315 | N/A |
| 58 | 18 | "Bush League" | December 15, 2020 | 316 | N/A |
| 59 | 19 | "Crash 2K" | December 15, 2020 | TBA | N/A |
| 60 | 20 | "Game Time" | December 15, 2020 | 318 | N/A |

== Ratings ==
Viewership and ratings per season of Crashletes
| Season | Episodes | First aired | | Last aired | | Avg. viewers (millions) |
| Season | Episodes | Date | Viewers (millions) | Date | Viewers (millions) | Avg. viewers (millions) |
|---|---|---|---|---|---|---|
| 1 | 18 | July 5, 2016 | 1.44 | September 9, 2016 | 1.14 | 1.14 |
| 2 | 21 | September 16, 2016 | 1.22 | April 23, 2017 | 0.93 | 0.99 |
| 3 | 10 | February 3, 2019 | 0.60 | December 15, 2020 | TBD | 0.67 |
