= Northeast Consortium =

The Northeast Consortium is a group of high schools in northeast Montgomery County, Maryland, composed of James Hubert Blake High School, Paint Branch High School and Springbrook High School. Each school in the consortium is part of a "signature program", that established specialized programs at each of the schools. While Sherwood High School was not included in the consortium despite initial plans to include the school, it established a signature program in International Studies, similar to the three consortium schools.

Blake High School's signature program is Fine Arts and Humanities, while Springbrook's program focuses on "Information Technology in a Global Society" and International Baccalaureate. Paint Branch High School's signature program is Science and Media.

The program was established in 1998, coinciding with the opening of Blake High School. With the program, students can opt out of attending their designated “home” high school and choose one of the other schools. Students are guaranteed a spot at their "home" school if they wish to remain.
