= Burtonsville, Maryland =

- Census-designated place
- Location of Burtonsville, Maryland
- Coordinates: 39°07′27″N 76°56′20″W
- Country: United States
- State: Maryland
- County: Montgomery

Area
  - Total: 8.21 sq mi (21.27 km^{2})
  - Land: 7.84 sq mi (20.30 km^{2})
  - Water: 0.37 sq mi (0.97 km^{2})
- Elevation: 433 ft (132 m)

Population (2020)
  - Total: 9,498
  - Density: 1,212.0/sq mi (467.94/km^{2})
- Time zone: UTC−5 (Eastern (EST))
  - Summer (DST): UTC−4 (EDT)
- ZIP code: 20866
- Area codes: 240, 301
- FIPS code: 24-11750
- GNIS feature ID: 2389261

Burtonsville is a census-designated place and an unincorporated area in Montgomery County, Maryland, United States. It is situated in the northeast corner of Montgomery County, right on the border of both Howard and Prince George's counties. It is considered a suburban town in the Washington metropolitan area.

It is twenty miles (32 km) southwest of downtown Baltimore, 16 miles (26 km) north of downtown Washington, D.C., and 25 miles (40 km) from Annapolis. Burtonsville recorded a population of 9,498 as of the 2020 census.

== History ==
In colonial times, the area was referred to as the Patuxent Hundred and later the Eastern Branch Hundred, a community comprising approximately 100 inhabitants. Prince George's County Court recorded that on September 27, 1699, Thomas Wells and Thomas Pindell were appointed to be the overseers of Patuxant Hundred.

Among some of the earliest land grants are Maiden's Fancy, a 580-acre (2.3 km^{2}) tract surveyed for Neal Clark in 1700, and Bear Bacon nearby, a 600-acre (2.4 km^{2}) tract of land surveyed in 1703 for a Mark Richardson. Another prominent land holder was Richard Snowden, an iron master, who held various land patents in the area, including Snowdens Manor (surveyed 1715) consisting of an impressive 9,265 acres (37.49 km^{2}) and Snowdens Mill (surveyed 1723) occupying an additional 546 acres (2.21 km^{2}). From these larger tracts, among others, were carved smaller tracts of land which were either rented or sold off to planters and the like.

The community of Burtonsville, originally called Burton's, takes its name from Isaac Burton, who in 1825 bought out his siblings' shares of his father's land and became the major landowner in the area. He and his wife Keturah had 17 children, many of whom stayed in the area as adults. The community itself grew around the intersection of Old Columbia Pike and the road to Sandy Spring. In the 1850s Isaac Burton became the first postmaster of the newly established post office in the vicinity, which operated out of his store at the intersection. Burtonsville's core area today continues to center around the intersection of Maryland Route 198 and U.S. Route 29.

== Geography ==
As an unincorporated area, Burtonsville's boundaries are not officially defined. Burtonsville is, however, recognized by the United States Census Bureau and by the United States Geological Survey as a census-designated place.

According to the United States Census Bureau, the place has a total area of 8.0 square miles (21 km^{2}), of which 7.8 square miles (20 km^{2}) is land and 0.2 square mile (0.4 km^{2}, or 1.88%) is water.

== Demographics ==
Historical population
Census	Pop.	Note	%±
2000	7,305		—
2010	8,323		13.9%
2020	9,498		14.1%
U.S. Decennial Census; 2010–2020

=== Racial and ethnic composition ===
Burtonsville CDP, Maryland – Racial and ethnic composition Note: the US Census treats Hispanic/Latino as an ethnic category. This table excludes Latinos from the racial categories and assigns them to a separate category. Hispanics/Latinos may be of any race.
Race / Ethnicity (NH = Non-Hispanic)	Pop 2000	Pop 2010	Pop 2020	% 2000	% 2010	% 2020
White alone (NH)	3,573	2,468	1,963	48.91%	29.65%	20.67%
Black or African American alone (NH)	1,844	3,142	4,062	25.24%	37.75%	42.77%
Native American or Alaska Native alone (NH)	13	13	20	0.18%	0.16%	0.21%
Asian alone (NH)	1,286	1,688	1,833	17.60%	20.28%	19.30%
Native Hawaiian or Pacific Islander alone (NH)	1	2	4	0.01%	0.02%	0.04%
Other race alone (NH)	8	28	73	0.11%	0.34%	0.77%
Mixed race or Multiracial (NH)	171	243	362	2.34%	2.92%	3.81%
Hispanic or Latino (any race)	409	739	1,181	5.60%	8.88%	12.43%
Total	7,305	8,323	9,498	100.00%	100.00%	100.00%

=== 2020 census ===
As of the 2020 census, Burtonsville had a population of 9,498. The population density was 1,211.9 inhabitants per square mile (467.9/km^{2}). The median age was 39.1 years. 22.8% of residents were under the age of 18 and 13.3% of residents were 65 years of age or older. For every 100 females there were 90.4 males, and for every 100 females age 18 and over there were 86.8 males age 18 and over.

91.7% of residents lived in urban areas, while 8.3% lived in rural areas.

There were 3,021 households in Burtonsville, of which 39.5% had children under the age of 18 living in them. Of all households, 57.1% were married-couple households, 11.4% were households with a male householder and no spouse or partner present, and 27.3% were households with a female householder and no spouse or partner present. About 16.6% of all households were made up of individuals and 5.6% had someone living alone who was 65 years of age or older.

There were 3,117 housing units, of which 3.1% were vacant. The homeowner vacancy rate was 0.9% and the rental vacancy rate was 4.4%.

Racial composition as of the 2020 census
Race	Number	Percent
White	2,088	22.0%
Black or African American	4,131	43.5%
American Indian and Alaska Native	48	0.5%
Asian	1,841	19.4%
Native Hawaiian and Other Pacific Islander	6	0.1%
Some other race	617	6.5%
Two or more races	767	8.1%

=== Income and poverty ===
The median income for a household in the area was $138,416, and the median income for a family was $94,991. The per capita income for the area was $48,711. About 3.2% of the population were below the poverty line, including 1.6% of those under age 18 and 3.4% of those age 65 or over.

== Transportation ==
Burtonsville has over 10 Metro bus stops throughout the town. The town is also home to the Burtonsville Park & Ride, a large Metro and Charter bus stop/parking lot located right off of U.S. Route 29 going southbound.

=== Nearby airports ===
There are 3 major airports located within one hour driving:

- Baltimore–Washington International Airport (BWI), 18 miles
- Ronald Reagan Washington National Airport (Reagan), 28 miles
- Washington Dulles International Airport (Dulles), 37 miles

=== Major highways & roads ===
- Intercounty Connector (MD 200)
- U.S. Route 29
- Maryland Route 198
- Maryland Route 28, westbound toward Rockville, MD
- Interstate 95, 4 miles east
- Interstate 495 (Capital Beltway), 9 miles via U.S. Route 29 South

== Neighborhoods ==
Burtonsville is broken up into several neighborhoods:

- McKnew (McKnew Road, right off of Maryland Route 198)
- Blackburn (right off of U.S. Route 29)
- Greencastle
- Country Place
- Briarcliff
- Lion's Den
- Dustin Road
- Perrywood Estates
- Peach Orchard
- Riding Stable
- Kruhm Road
- Dino Drive

== Culture ==
Burtonsville holds an annual "Burtonsville Day," a celebration that includes a parade, festival, craft fair, games for children, live bands, entertainment, and food. The event involves many small social gatherings at different places, with activities such as petting zoos and various games.

Burtonsville Cars and Coffee, dubbed "The Church Of The Holy Donut" is an informal gathering of car enthusiasts who meet every Sunday to display all types of vehicles from classic cars to current, stylized automobiles.

One prominent society is the Burtonsville Lions Club, an international group that is a focal point for community service in Burtonsville and surrounding communities.

== Education ==
Burtonsville has three public schools that are part of the Montgomery County Public Schools System. All three schools are located on the same road, Old Columbia Pike.

- Paint Branch High School
- Benjamin Banneker Middle School
- Burtonsville Elementary School
