= Paint Branch High School =

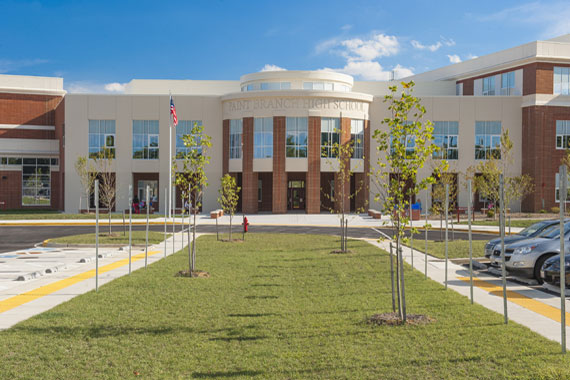

Location
- 14121 Old Columbia Pike; Burtonsville, Maryland 20866; United States; 39°5′10″N 76°56′49″W

Information
- Type: Public high school
- Motto: Excellence Through Effort
- Established: 1969; 57 years ago (rebuilt in 2012)
- School district: Montgomery County Public Schools
- CEEB code: 210316
- NCES School ID: 240048000890
- Principal: Dr. Shawaan T. Robinson
- Teaching staff: 130.42 FTE (2022-23)
- Grades: 9-12
- Gender: Co-educational
- Enrollment: 2,135 (2022-23)
- Student to teacher ratio: 16.37 (2022-23)
- Colors: Dark maroon and vegas gold
- Mascot: Panthers
- Newspaper: Mainstream
- Yearbook: Felidae
- Website: montgomeryschoolsmd.org/schools/paintbranchhs

Paint Branch High School is a public high school located in the Fairland census-designated place in unincorporated Montgomery County, Maryland, with a Burtonsville postal address. It is part of the Montgomery County Public Schools system. The school lies on Old Columbia Pike, between Briggs Chaney and Greencastle Road.

Paint Branch was founded in 1969, and is named after the nearby Paint Branch tributary stream. It is a member of the Northeast Consortium of Montgomery County high schools. As a member of the Consortium, the school's signature program focuses on Science and Media education.

In 2000, Paint Branch was awarded the Blue Ribbon Award, as well as the New American High School Award in 2000.

== History ==
Paint Branch High School first opened its doors in the fall of 1969.

=== New building ===
Paint Branch was guaranteed a new building when it was invited to enter the Northeast Consortium in 1998. The new building was scheduled to be completed by the end of 2010, but budget shortfalls pushed that date until April 2012, resulting in the class of 2013 being the first class to graduate from the new building. It was built on the space once occupied by woods next to the football field. Staff moved into the new building in June 2012.

The old Paint Branch building was torn down in October 2012. Sports fields were completed by the 2013–2014 school year.

== Athletics ==
The mascot of Paint Branch High School's athletic teams is a panther, and their fight song is "Hail to the Panthers", sung to the tune of "Hail to the Commanders". The school's colors are maroon and gold, also similar to the Washington Commanders.

Paint Branch competes in the 4A North division in the Maryland Public Secondary Schools Athletic Association (MPSSAA). The Panthers have fielded a total of 23 state championship athletic teams, including Girls Basketball (1979, 1980, 2001, 2008), Baseball (1976, 1979, 1990, 1991), Boys' Basketball (1977, 2000), Wrestling (1978, 2001), Boys' Cross-Country (1973, 1974), Boys' Track and Field (Indoor 2003, 2019, 2020; Outdoor 2003), Girls' Track and Field (Indoor 2009, Outdoor 1989), Field Hockey (2009), Softball (1987), and Football (1975).

== Notable alumni ==
- Tracy Jackson (1977), NBA basketball player
- Fredricka Whitfield (1983), news anchor for CNN
- Brian Heidik (1986), winner of Survivor: Thailand
- Eun Yang (1991), television news anchor of WRC-TV
- Darnell Dockett (1999), Former Pro-Bowl NFL player
- Kimmy Gatewood (1999), actress, writer, and singer
- Rahne Jones (2005), American television actress
- Brendan Yates (2008), American singer and frontman of the band Turnstile (band)
- Durell Nchami (2018), American football player
