= Amba Kak =

Technology policy adviser and researcher

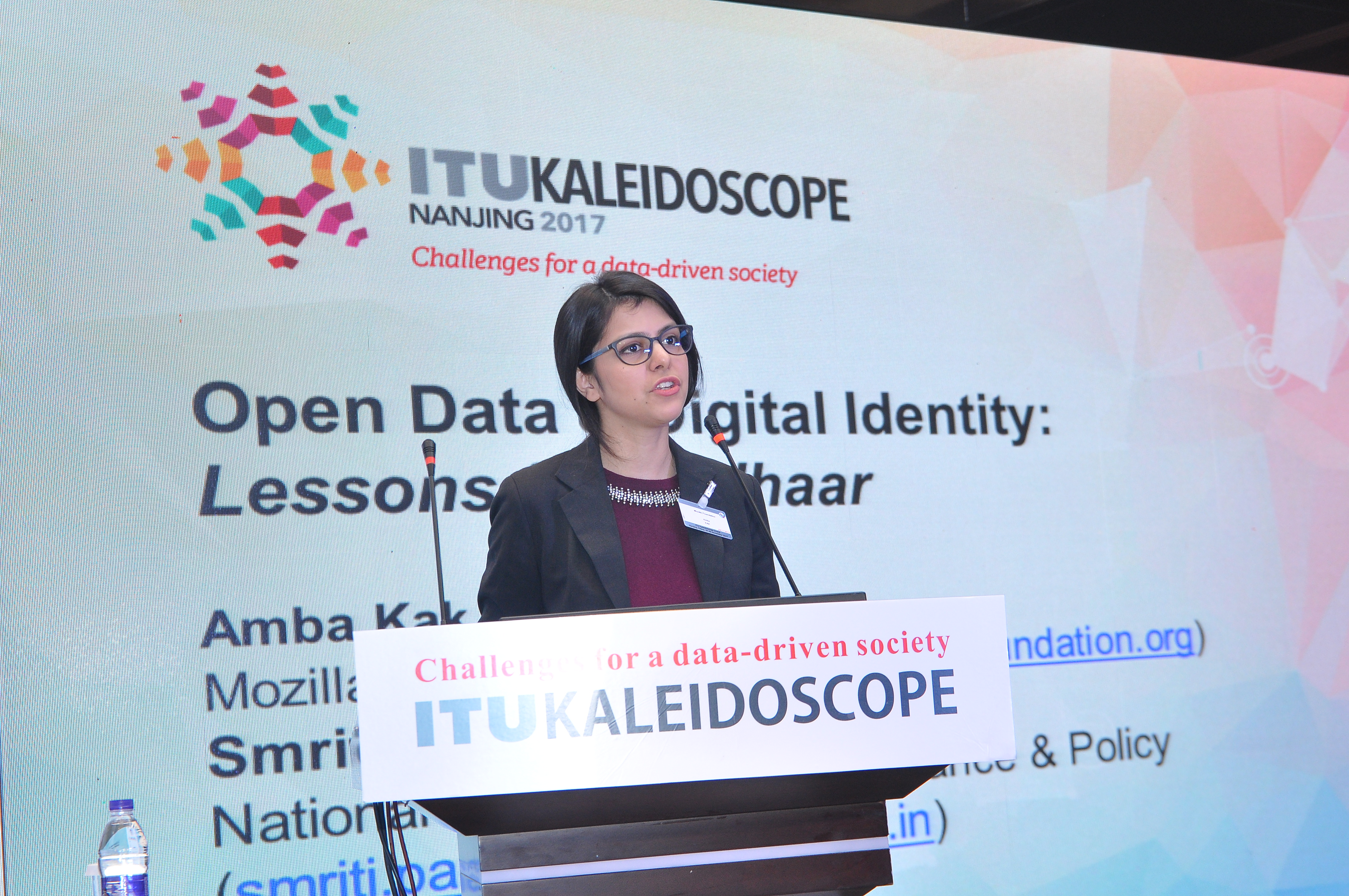
- Education: West Bengal National University of Juridical Sciences, Oxford University
- Organizations: Mozilla Foundation; AI Now Institute; Ada Lovelace Institute Signal Foundation
- Known for: technology policy, AI, net neutrality

Amba Kak is a US-based technology policy expert who is the Co-Executive Director of AI Now Institute, a US-based research institute.

In 2021, she served as senior advisor on AI to the Federal Trade Commission, advising the US federal regulator on emerging technology issues.

She is on the Board of the Signal Foundation and working group member at the Ada Lovelace Institute and on the Steering Committee of the Knight Georgetown Institute.

Amba is a member of New York City's Mayor Elect Zohran Mamdani's transition team.

In 2024 TIME magazine listed Kak among 100 most influential people in AI.

== Early life and education ==
Kak was born and raised in New Delhi, India. She studied law at the National University of Juridical Sciences in Kolkata, India. As a Rhodes scholar, she later obtained a Master's in Law and a Master of Science in the Social Science of the Internet from University of Oxford. At Oxford University, her research focused on net neutrality.

She is a former Google policy fellow. Over the year 2016/2017 she was a Mozilla Technology Policy Fellow. Currently, Kak is a senior research fellow at Cybersecurity and Privacy Institute at Northeastern University.

From 2016 to 2019, Kak was an adviser with the Mozilla Corporation.

In 2021, Kak was nominated to serve as AI adviser at the US Federal Trade Commission.

She serves as a board member at the Signal Foundation, advisory board member at the Mozilla Foundation and a working group member at the Ada Lovelace Institute.

== Career ==
=== Mozilla ===
Kak was a global policy advisor to Mozilla, and net-neutrality advisor to the Indian national telecom regulator TRAI during her time as legal consultant at the National Institute of Public Finance and Policy.

She was selected in 2016 as one of Mozilla’s inaugural cohort of technology policy fellows, to work on global network neutrality advocacy.

In 2017, she joined Mozilla Corporation as global policy advisor, where she advised the organization on developing and advancing Mozilla’s position on issues ranging from privacy and data protection to competition and online content regulation, for example, advocating for strong privacy laws in India as well as digital competition rules in France.

=== AI Now ===
Kak joined AI Now in 2019, initially as Director of Global Policy, and in 2022 as Executive Director of the Institute. AI Now is a research institute focused on the social implications of artificial intelligence and related technologies started by Meredith Whittaker and Kate Crawford in 2017 after a symposium hosted by the White House. Under Amba Kak and Sarah Myers West’s leadership, AI Now was awarded the Global AI Policy Leader award in 2024 in the civil society organization category.

=== Research on privacy, surveillance, and concentrated power ===
Kak has written and spoken publicly on concerns relating to state and commercial surveillance, in both the US and India. She has written widely on the surveillance dangers of biometric technologies including as editor of an edited collection of essays titled “Regulating Biometris” published by AI Now. Her paper with Rashida Richardson on the risks of “suspect-development system” databases won the prestigious Reidenberg-Kerr Award for Outstanding Scholarship at the Privacy Law Scholars Conference.

In 2023, Kak and Sarah Myers West also spearheaded discussion on the risks of AI technology to solidify and reinforce the dominance of large tech companies.

Kak has served as a journal reviewer for Big Data & Society and Nature and she has reviewed conference submissions as a Program Committee member for Rights Con and for ACM FAccT.

=== Congressional Testimony ===
Kak has testified before Congress at a hearing on artificial intelligence and data privacy in October 2023 and before the Senate Commerce Committee in July 2024.
