= Woodward High School =

Woodward High School may refer to one of several high schools in the United States:

- Woodward Career Technical High School – Cincinnati, Ohio
- Woodward High School (Toledo, Ohio) – Toledo, Ohio
- Charles W. Woodward High School – Rockville, Maryland
