= Northeastern University School of Law =

Law school in Boston, Massachusetts

Coordinates: 42°20′21.15″N 71°5′26.93″W

- Motto: Lux, Veritas, Virtus
- Parent school: Northeastern University
- Established: 1898
- School type: Private
- Parent endowment: $ 795.0 million (2017)
- Dean: James Hackney
- Location: Boston, Massachusetts, United States
- Enrollment: 486
- Faculty: 82
- USNWR ranking: 68th (tie) (2024)
- Bar pass rate: 90.3%
- Website: law.northeastern.edu
- ABA profile: Standard 509

The Northeastern University School of Law is the law school of Northeastern University in Boston, Massachusetts.

== History ==
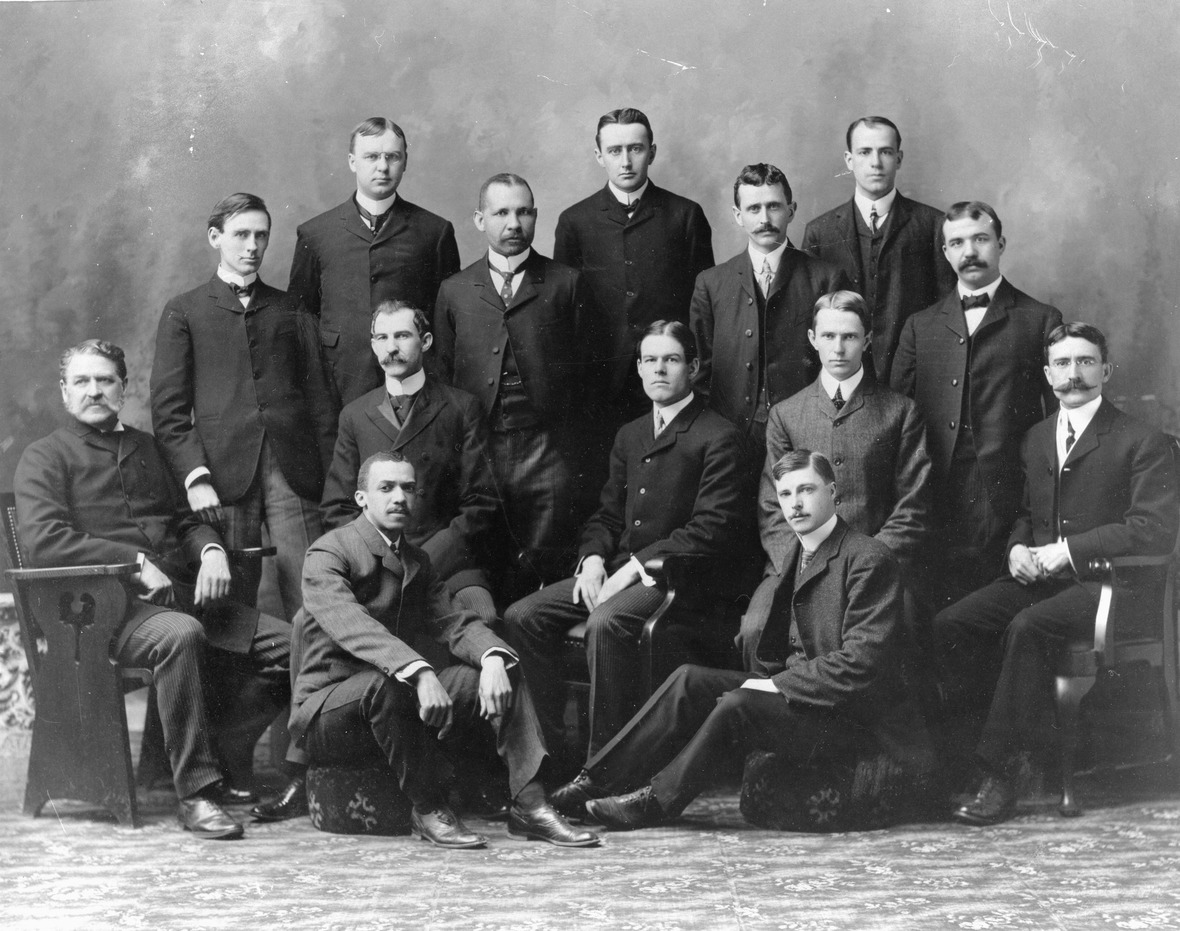
The first graduating class of Northeastern University School of Law in 1902.

Northeastern University School of Law was founded by the Boston Young Men's Christian Association (YMCA) in 1898 as the first evening law program in the city. At the time, only two law schools were in the Boston area and the time-honored practice of reading law in the office of an established lawyer was losing its effectiveness. An advisory committee, consisting of James Barr Ames, dean of the Harvard Law School; Samuel Bennett, dean of the Boston University School of Law; and Massachusetts Judge James R. Dunbar, was formed to assist with the formation of the evening law program. The program was incorporated as an LL.B.-granting law school, the Evening School of Law of Boston YMCA, in 1904. Additional campuses of YMCA Law School were opened in Worcester, Massachusetts by 1917, in Springfield, Massachusetts by 1919, and Providence, Rhode Island by 1921. The Worcester and Providence branches were closed by 1942, but the Springfield branch eventually became the Western New England University School of Law. In its early days, the school "saw itself as the working man's alternative to the elite schools" and "boasted of being 'An Evening Law School with Day School Standards,'" using the case method of teaching, according to legal historian Robert Stevens.

The school was renamed Northeastern University School of Law in 1922 and began admitting women that year. NUSL was accredited by the University of the State of New York in 1943 and became a member of the Association of American Law Schools in 1945. It was accredited by the American Bar Association in 1969.

In April 1953, Northeastern President Carl Ell announced that the law school would close. He cited the number of other law schools that had sprung up elsewhere in the city. Meanwhile, enrollment at Northeastern law school had plummeted, from 1,328 students in 1937-38 to 196 students in that year. The school's building and library on Mt. Vernon Street in Beacon Hill was eventually sold. Alumni - who composed one-fourth of Massachusetts's Superior Court judges as well as many District Court judges - worked to reestablish the law school in 1966, based upon the university's signature cooperative, or co-op, education model. Thomas J. O'Toole, a Harvard Law graduate, was selected as the school's dean in 1967, and the school re-opened in 1968. In 1970, Gryzmish Hall on Huntington Avenue was dedicated, which would later become part of the Asa S. Knowles Center for Law. Despite the school's working-class origins, rigorous new admissions policies resulted in a small student body of 125 students, nearly all of whom came from financially well-off families and upper-echelon undergraduate colleges. Still, half of those admitted as first-year students were women.

Over the ensuing decades, students worked in co-ops all over North America, led by a contingent in Alaska. A number of graduates practicing law as varied as Native American land claims in rural Maine; assisting migrant farm laborers in east Texas; at the Moscow, Russia office of Baker & McKenzie; the United Nations High Commission for Refugees in New Delhi; and countless legal services offices. In 1968, O'Toole, explaining the school's dedication to public interest law, told a Boston Globe reporter that "law schools are still teaching lawyers as if they were all going out to be corporation lawyers on Wall Street...(but) the big demand for lawyers today is in the field of public affairs in government, and in dealing with basic human problems, and no law school today seems to be training lawyers for those jobs."

== Campus ==
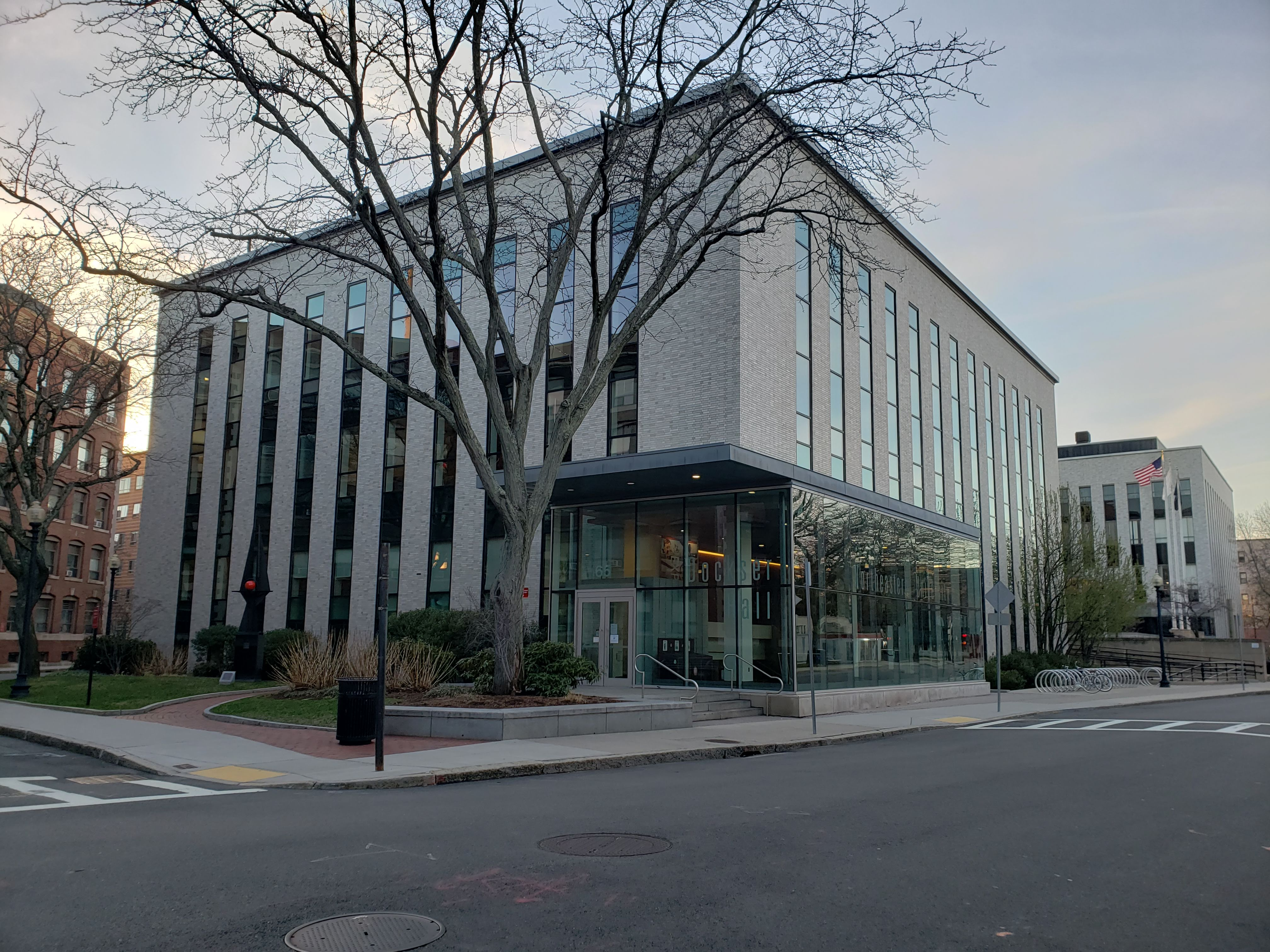
Dockser Hall

The NUSL complex is located on Boston's Huntington Avenue and includes three adjacent buildings: Knowles Center, which houses offices and the Law Library; Cargill Hall, home to most faculty and some administrative offices as well as small seminar rooms and lecture halls; and Dockser Hall, which includes a moot courtroom, classrooms, seminar rooms, offices and lounge areas and space for the law school's clinical program.

== Academics ==
NUSL offers a Juris Doctor (JD) program for full-time, on-campus students as well as a FlexJD program for part-time students online and on-campus that began in the fall of 2021. The law school also offers on-campus and online Master of Laws (LLM) programs for lawyers seeking to expand their legal knowledge. In addition, the school offers programs for non-lawyers, including a Master of Science (MS) in Media Advocacy and online programs leading to graduate certificates in health law, intellectual property law, business law and human resources law, plus a data privacy fundamentals program.

NUSL integrates full-time employment into its traditional JD curriculum, allowing students to graduate in three years - the same amount of time as peers at other law schools. Following the first year of study, students alternate between classroom and co-op professional experience until they graduate with three, full-time employment experiences. Instead of grades, students receive written evaluations from their professors and co-op employers.

Many students participate in the school's clinics and institutes, such as the Civil Rights and Restorative Justice Project. In addition, all students are required to complete a year-long social justice project during their first year.

== Rankings ==
Northeastern is ranked No. 1 for "Practical Training" by The National Jurist and No. 2 for public interest law.

The school is ranked No. 77 in Best Law Schools by U.S. News & World Report.

== Costs ==
Tuition for a full-time Northeastern student is $65,652 per year. The total cost of attendance (indicating the cost of tuition, fees and living expenses) at Northeastern law school for the 2025–2026 academic year is $88,926 for first year full-time students and $99,548 for upper-level full-time students.

== Student journals ==
NUSL is home to two scholarly legal journals.

=== Northeastern University Law Review ===
The Northeastern University Law Review is a law review founded in 2008 that publishes a broad array of legal scholarship primarily from law professors, judges, attorneys, and law students. Staffed and edited by law students, it is published twice a year. Staff members are selected largely based on an application that tests their fact-checking and cite-checking skills, and includes a diversity statement. The law review also publishes content through its online publications: Extra Legal and the Online Forum.

=== Journal of Legal Education ===
NUSL is co-editor of the Journal of Legal Education, a quarterly publication of the Association of American Law Schools. The Journal publishes articles on legal theory, legal scholarship and legal education, among other topics.

== Research centers, institutes and clinical programs ==
=== Centers of Excellence ===
- Center for Global Law and Justice (CGLJ)
- Center for Health Policy and Law (CHPL)
- Center for Law, Equity and Race (CLEAR)
- Center for Law, Information and Creativity (CLIC)
- Center for Public Interest Advocacy and Collaboration (CPIAC)

=== Clinics ===
- Civil Rights and Restorative Justice Clinic
- Community Business Clinic
- Domestic Violence Clinic
- Immigrant Justice Clinic
- Intellectual Property Law Clinic
- Prisoners' Rights Clinic
- Public Health Advocacy Clinic

=== Frontline Institutes and Programs ===
- Amy J. Reed Collaborative for Medical Device Safety
- Civil Rights and Restorative Justice Project
- Criminal Justice Task Force
- Domestic Violence Institute
- Health in Justice Action Lab
- Initiative for Energy Justice
- NuLawLab
- Program on Human Rights and Global Economy
- Program on the Corporation, Law and Global Society
- Public Health Advocacy Institute
- The Burnes Center for Social Change
- UnitedOnGuns

== Notable alumni ==
- Edward J. Voke, American politician who served as the 36th mayor of Chelsea, Massachusetts
- Charlotte Hunter Arley, lawyer in Reno, Nevada Petticoats Trial
- Janet Bond Arterton, Judge, United States District Court for the District of Connecticut
- Mary Bonauto, Civil Rights Project Director, Gay & Lesbian Advocates & Defenders; lead counsel in Goodridge v. Department of Public Health; MacArthur "Genius"
- Margot Botsford, Justice, Massachusetts Supreme Judicial Court (retired)
- Timothy Mark Burgess, Judge, United States District Court for the District of Alaska
- Marie-Therese Connolly, Elder Rights Lawyer, MacArthur "Genius"
- William "Mo" Cowan, US Senator (retired); Vice President, Litigation and Legal Policy, General Electric
- Wayne Dennison, American lawyer
- Harold Donohue, (deceased) Member, US House of Representatives
- Martín Espada, poet, recipient of 2018 Ruth Lilly Poetry Prize
- Dana Fabe, Justice, Alaska Supreme Court (retired)
- Thomas A. Flaherty, (deceased) Member, US House of Representatives
- Peter Franchot, Comptroller of Maryland
- Kumiki Gibson, Former Chief Counsel to Vice President Al Gore
- Maggie Hassan, United States Senator for New Hampshire
- Maura Healey, Governor and Attorney General (2015-2023), Commonwealth of Massachusetts
- Courtney Hunt, Academy Award-nominated film director/screenwriter in 2009 for Frozen River
- Candace Kovacic-Fleischer, gender equality expert, Professor emerita, Washington College of Law, American University
- Landya McCafferty, US District Court Judge for the District of New Hampshire
- Rishi Reddi, short story writer, Best American Short Stories
- Emily Gray Rice, Former US Attorney for New Hampshire
- Rashida Richardson, director of policy research at the AI Now Institute
- Delissa A. Ridgway, Judge, US Court of International Trade
- Victoria A. Roberts, Judge, United States District Court for the Eastern District of Michigan
- Rachael Rollins, United States Attorney for the District of Massachusetts and District Attorney, Suffolk County (2019-2022)
- Chase Strangio, ACLU Staff Attorney, LGBT & HIV Project, and transgender rights activist
- Urvashi Vaid, Author, Irresistible Revolution: Confronting Race, Class and the Assumptions of LGBT Politics (2012) and Virtual Equality: The Mainstreaming of Lesbian and Gay Liberation (1996); CEO, The Vaid Group
- Stephen Morse Wheeler, justice of the New Hampshire Supreme Court
- Leslie Winner, North Carolina Former State Senator
- Leocadia Zak, President, Agnes Scott College
- Shalanda Baker, energy justice academic and policymaker, former professional women's rugby player
