= Wayne Dennison =

American celebrity lawyer

Wayne Dennison is an American lawyer. He is a partner at international law firm Brown Rudnick and is best known as special trial counsel to actor Johnny Depp in his successful defamation litigation against former-wife Amber Heard, and for the cross-examinations he conducted.

== Early life and education ==
Wayne grew up outside the small village of Oriskany in rural upstate New York. His parents, Fred and Kay Dennison, owned and operated Mills Electrical Supply, a wholesale/retail electrical supply company, for over 60 years. In 1991, Dennison earned his J.D. from Northeastern University School of Law. Dennison also attended the Harvard Kennedy School and was awarded a MPA (Masters in Public Administration) in 1998.

== Legal career ==
Wayne has spent his entire career at Brown Rudnick since starting as a co-op student in February 1991 during his final year at Northeastern University School of Law. He was promoted to practice group leader of Brown Rudnick's Litigation & Dispute Resolution practice after becoming an equity partner. He is co-chair of Brown Rudnick's Brand and Reputation management team, which works on defending the reputation of celebrities and business people.

In 1995, Wayne was part of the Brown Rudnick team that represented Massachusetts in its lawsuit against the tobacco industry. The litigation resulted in an $8.3 billion settlement for Massachusetts, the then-largest monetary settlement in state history. Wayne is a founding board member of the Brown Rudnick Charitable Foundation, which was initially funded in 2001 with a portion of the fees received from the tobacco settlement.

In 2022, Wayne represented Johnny Depp in the Depp v. Heard defamation trial. Wayne cross-examined Dr. David Spiegel, one of Amber's psychiatrist expert witnesses who claimed that Depp had "behaviors that are consistent with someone that both has substance use disorder as well as behaviors of someone who is a perpetrator of intimate partner violence." Spiegel apologized for what he said after Wayne pressed him on his comments about assessing Depp in his blockbuster movies. Wayne and Spiegel sparred over whether Depp used an earpiece on set after Spiegel testified that the use of the device could be a sign of cognitive decline from heavy drug and alcohol use over the years. Spiegel said he could tell Depp's processing speed was down. Wayne then brought up Depp's portrayal as Willy Wonka in "Charlie and the Chocolate Factory" and how this impacted Spiegel's analysis of processing speeds. But Spiegel confessed he had never seen the movie.

Wayne cross-examined Kathryn Arnold, one of Amber's damages experts. She supported Amber's counterclaim that her work and publicity suddenly dried up after Depp's attorney Adam Waldman characterized her abuse allegations as a "hoax," leading to a sustained media negativity campaign. In his cross, Wayne attempted to show that despite the timing, the Waldman "hoax" statement merely correlated with, but did not cause the negativity campaign against Heard.

Wayne also cross-examined one of Amber Heard's rebuttal witnesses. Wayne asked Dr. Dawn Hughes if she can say that Depp was not abused. He also asked her if she was aware of the circumstances leading to Amber filing a temporary restraining order and asked if James Franco or Elon Musk spent the night with her during that period.

In 2024, Wayne, as lead counsel for Wynn Resorts, prevailed in a class-action lawsuit that ran for over a half-decade. Richard Schuster filed the lawsuit in 2019, claiming that Wynn's Encore Boston Harbor was cheating patrons by not fully paying out slot machine vouchers. The casino’s self-service kiosks, known as ticket redemption units (TRUs), which pay out slot winnings, do not dispense coins but provide a voucher for the remaining change value of less than a dollar. Patrons could redeem vouchers at any time at the casino cashier. The First Circuit said Wynn's casino didn't violate state gaming laws or engage in deceptive business practices.

Wayne is a frequent TV commentator on high-profile trials and celebrity cases. He has appeared on Court TV's "Vinnie Politian Investigates" Law & Crime Network and Inside Edition.
