= Candace Kovacic-Fleischer =

American lawyer

- Born: Candace Saari Kovacic; Washington, D.C., U.S.
- Education: Wellesley College (BA); Northeastern University (JD)
- Occupation: Law professor
- Known for: Expert on sex discrimination, gender equality and remedies
- Spouse: Walter H. Fleischer
- Children: 1

Candace Kovacic-Fleischer is an American legal scholar who is a professor emerita at American University Washington College of Law. She has taught there since 1981.

== Biography ==
Kovacic-Fleischer grew up in Kensington, Maryland and attended Walter Johnson High School. She studied at Wellesley College, where she received an A.B. in Economics in 1969, and at Northeastern University School of Law, graduating with a J.D. in 1974. After law school, she clerked first for Judge James L. Oakes of the United States Court of Appeals for the Second Circuit, and then Warren E. Burger, Chief Justice of the United States Supreme Court from 1975 to 1976. She was the first woman to clerk for the Chief Justice. Following her clerkships, she practiced law in Washington, D.C. as an associate of both Cole and Groner and Wilmer, Cutler, and Pickering.

In 1981, she joined the faculty of Washington College of Law at American University, and in 1986 was named a full professor. In 1988, she was a visiting professor at the University of California, Los Angeles Law School. In 2016, she wrote a letter to the editor pointing out the sexist elements in a blog post on President Donald Trump's economic advisors. In May 2017, she signed a letter concerning hate crimes on campus.

She is co-author of a popular case book, Equitable Remedies, Restitution and Damages, now in its eighth edition.

Since 2002, she has served as a member of the American Law Institute.

== Select publications ==
=== Books ===
- Kovacic-Fleischer, Candace S.; Love, Jean; Nelson, George (2010). Equitable Remedies, Restitution and Damages, Cases and Materials (American Casebook Series) (8th ed.). Eagen, MN: West Publishing. ISBN 978-0314194930. (5th ed., 1994; 6th ed., 2000; 7th ed., 2005).

=== Articles ===
- Kovacic-Fleischer, Candace (2017). "Food Stamps, Unjust Enrichment, and Minimum Wage". Law & Ineq. 35. University of Minnesota Law School: 1.
- Kovacic-Fleischer, Candace Saari (1999). "Litigating against Employment Penalties for Pregnancy, Breastfeeding and Childcare". Vill. L. Rev. 44 (3): 355.
- Kovacic-Fleischer, Candace (1997). "United States v. Virginia's New Gender Equal Protection Analysis with Ramifications for Pregnancy, Parenting, and Title VII". Vanderbilt Law Review. 50. SSRN: 845. SSRN 2353006.

== Personal life ==
She is married to Walter Hersch Fleischer, a Harvard Law School-educated lawyer specializing in appeals, and they have a child.

== See also ==
- List of law clerks for the chief justice of the United States
