= Steve Sands =

American golf television personality

Steven Sands
- Born: Washington metropolitan area, U.S.
- Occupation: Sports broadcaster
- Years active: 1990 – present
- Spouse: Valerie
- Children: Brian, Scott, and Eric

Steven Sands is an American golf television personality. He is best known as the lead interviewer for NBC's golf coverage. He also works with NBC's cable outlet, Golf Channel, as a studio host and play-by-play announcer.

He was given the nickname "Sandsie" by Tiger Woods.

== Early life and education ==
Sands grew up in and around Washington D.C.. He graduated from Charles W. Woodward High School in North Bethesda, Maryland, and then from Colorado State University in 1991, earning a bachelor's degree in technical journalism.

== Career ==
In 1990, Sands interned at CNN Sports. He has worked at the Golf Channel since 2001.

He was also part of the NBC's coverage of the 2014 Winter Olympics in Sochi, Russia, where he was a speed skating reporter.

As part of the NBC broadcast of the 2018 TOUR Championship, Steve interviewed Tiger Woods on the course after Tiger recorded his 80th career PGA Tour win, his first in over five years.

He was inducted into the Greater Washington Jewish Sports Hall of Fame in 2009.

Sands is a regular guest on The Tony Kornheiser Show. The host, Tony Kornheiser, found the name La Cheeserie amusing and asked his listeners to yell it at Sands when they see him working sporting events; he has heard shouts of "La Cheeserie!", including when he traveled to Scotland at the British Open in 2016.

From 1966 to 2025, the Sands family owned and operated Calvert Woodley Wines and Spirits, which is also home to La Cheeserie, a cheese merchant.
