= Walter Johnson High School =

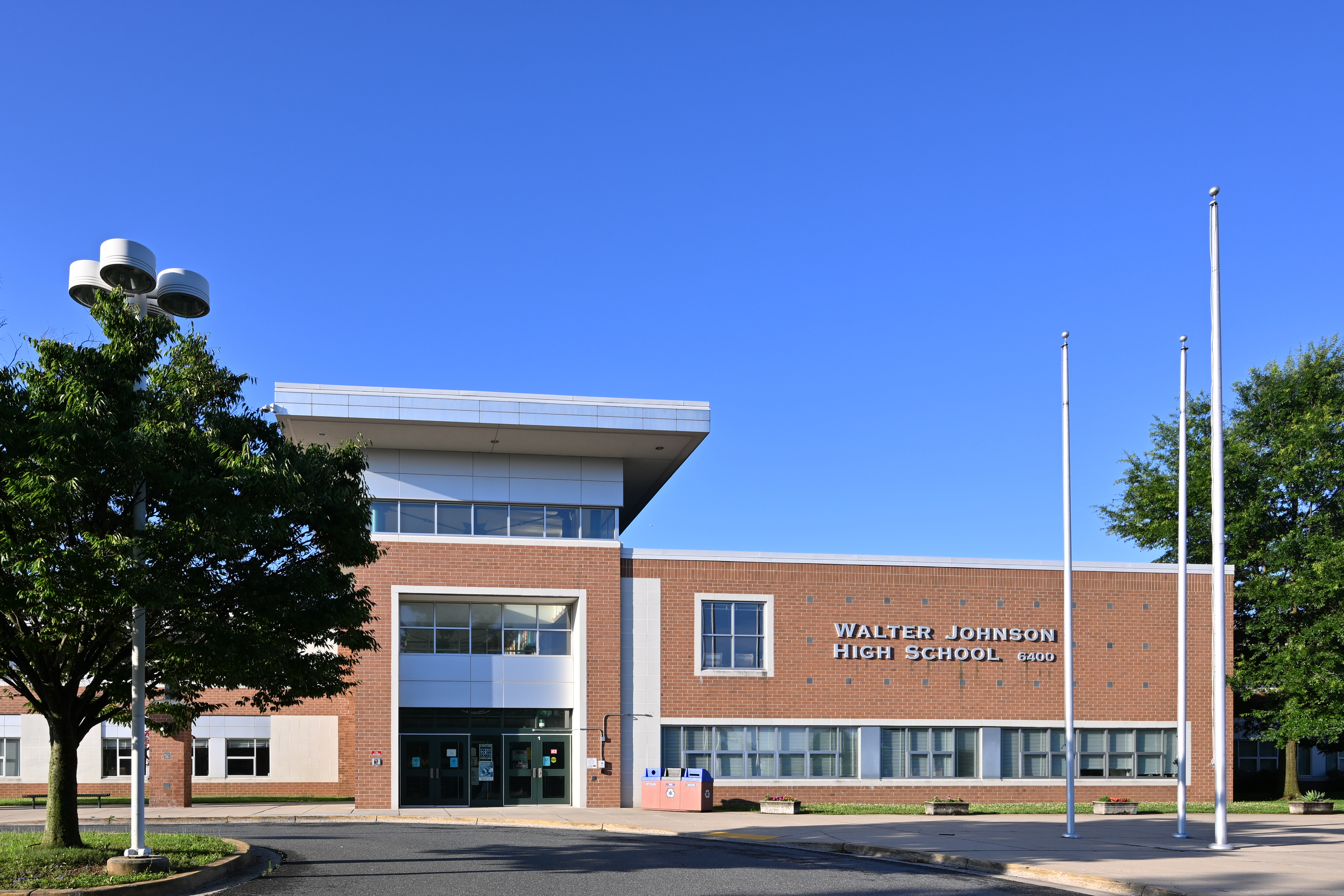
- The front of the school as viewed from Rock Spring Drive

Location
- 6400 Rock Spring Drive; North Bethesda CDP (Bethesda postal address), Maryland 20814-1913; United States
- Coordinates: 39°01′34″N 77°08′06″W

Information
- Type: Public high school
- Established: 1956; 70 years ago
- Status: Open
- School district: Montgomery County Public Schools
- NCES District ID: 2400480
- CEEB code: 210912
- NCES School ID: 240048000942
- Principal: Nicole J. Morgan
- Teaching staff: 153.90 (FTE) (2021-2022)
- Grades: 9–12
- Enrollment: 2,870 (2021-2022)
  - Grade 9: 814
  - Grade 10: 684
  - Grade 11: 674
  - Grade 12: 698
- Student to teacher ratio: 18.65:1 (2021-2022)
- Campus type: Suburban
- Colors: Green; White
- Mascot: The Mighty Moo & Wildcat
- Nickname: WJ
- Rival: Bethesda-Chevy Chase High School
- Newspaper: The Pitch
- Yearbook: The Windup
- Website: www2.montgomeryschoolsmd.org/schools/wjhs

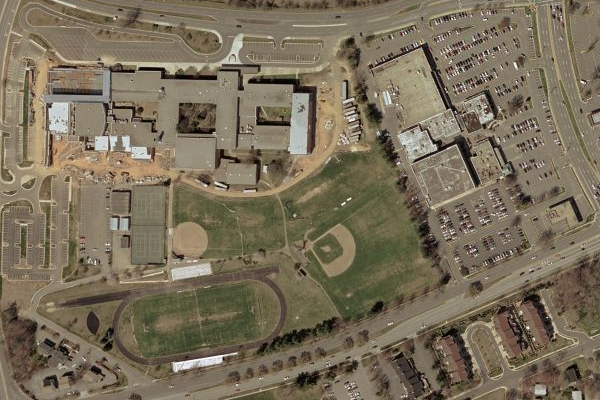
Aerial U.S. Geological Survey photo of WJHS taken during its construction in April 2002

Walter Johnson High School (also known as Walter Johnson, WJHS, or WJ) is a public high school located in the census-designated place of Bethesda, Maryland. The school was founded in 1956 and named after Walter Johnson, an American baseball player who resided in Montgomery County, Maryland. The high school was the first to be named after a player of Major League Baseball.

WJHS serves portions of Bethesda, North Bethesda, Potomac, and Rockville, as well as the towns of Garrett Park and Kensington. It is a part of Montgomery County Public Schools (MCPS).

== History ==
=== 20th century ===
The school first opened with grades 10-12 in 1956, and was named after a famous American baseball pitcher and politician, Walter Johnson, who lived in the area and had died 10 years prior. The school's original mascot and team name was the Spartans, as the student body chose to base their own colors and mascot on the Michigan State University Spartans. Originally, the school only educated 11th and 12th graders.

In 1963, Mighty Moo, a dairy cow named after the cows that roamed the adjacent fields of the Davis farm until the early 90s, was named the school mascot. After a 1987 consolidation with nearby Charles W. Woodward High School, Walter Johnson maintained its school colors of white and green, but adopted Woodward's mascot, "Wild Thing" the Wildcat. In 1963, a group of Seniors's painted Mighty Moo onto the school chimney where it remains to this day.

=== 21st century ===
In 2024, total enrollment expanded to over 3,000 students, with over 700 in each grade. To reduce overcrowding, local school leaders scheduled the reopening of Woodward High School for August 2027. Budgeting for the construction of Woodward High School has been problematic, with up to 39 million dollars lost in funding "due to errors in calculating prevailing wage and bid award across the multiple phases of the project".

== Academics ==
Walter Johnson High School established their APEX-Reach Signature Program in 1996. This APEX-Reach Program leads students through a more rigorous curriculum through a combination of honors and Advance Placement (AP) classes.

The school has offered Advance Placement (AP) classes since before 1996 with a total of 28 AP classes. Since the fall of 2023, Montgomery County Public Schools (MCPS) will pay for all AP and International Baccalaureate (IB) exams that students who take these courses will take.

WJ students average a score of 1192 on the SAT, with 604 on verbal and 588 on math.

As of 2024, Walter Johnson is the 15th-ranked high school in Maryland and the 855th-ranked nationally, according to U.S. News & World Report.

== Construction ==
In 1960, sixteen more rooms were added to the school along ten more in 1964. Construction in the mid-1970s introduced the addition to a secondary gym and theater. In the merge with the Charles W. Woodward High School, more lockers, trophy cases, and seven portable classrooms were added.

At the start of the 2001-2002 school year began construction plans to renovate the school. The construction took ten years which included 19 more classrooms, 4 more science labs, a new cafeteria, a stadium, a media center, a new gym, and a new auditorium. The renovation also includes the addition of more amenities like an art, music, and technology suite. The school's entrance was designed to have a glass ceiling decorated with 90 national flags representing the nationalities of the student population.

== School Articulation Patterns ==
Walter Johnson serves two middle schools, each of which serve three elementary schools.

North Bethesda Middle School

- Ashburton Elementary School
- Kensington Parkwood Elementary School
- Wyngate Elementary School

Tilden Middle School

- Farmland Elementary School
- Garrett Park Elementary School
- Luxmanor Elementary School

=== Expected changes ===
With overcrowding at many schools in the Downcounty area, especially Walter Johnson, Woodward will be fully reopening with the goal of alleviating overcrowding at nearby schools. To address these concerns, MCPS has begun a boundary study that will affect up to eight high school service areas: Bethesda-Chevy Chase, Walter Johnson, Walt Whitman, and the five high schools within the Downcounty Consortium. The boundary changes are expected to take place at the start of the 2027-28 school year, when Northwood high school students will return to their expanded facility.

== Activities ==
=== Athletics ===
The school offers a variety of sports with fall, winter, and springs sports. In the fall, the school offers cross country, field hockey, football, golf, pom's, soccer, and volleyball. In the winter, the school offers baseketball, bocce, indoor track, swimming, and wrestling. In the spring, the school offers baseball, lacrosse, softball, tennis, track, and volleyball.

=== Writing ===
Walter Johnson has classes to support their literature with their own newspaper, The Pitch, as well as their own literary magazine, The Spectator. Their yearbook is named The Windup.

=== Music ===
The school contains several ensembles for music like the Madrigals, Choir, Jazz Ensemble, Band, Orchestra and Wind Ensemble. These ensembles often perform for county and/or state competitions in various venues.

Walter Johnson also has their own musical productions, WJ STAGE, and along with it their own production crew.

== Demographics ==
As of 2022-2023:

Race / Ethnicity (2022-2023)	Number	Percent
White	1,459	49.8%
Black	378	12.9%
Native American/Alaska Native	7	0.24%
Asian	359	12.2%
Native Hawaiian/Pacific Islander	5	0.17%
Hispanic	537	18.3%
Two or More Races	186	6.35%
Total	2,931	100%

== Notable alumni ==
- Jonathan Allen, political journalist
- Robb Austin, politician, Pennsylvania House of Representatives
- Siribha Chudabhorn, princess of Thailand
- David John Doukas, physician and medical ethicist
- Anita Dunn, former advisor to President Barack Obama
- Carol Dysinger, professor, filmmaker, editor, Academy Award for Best Documentary Short Subject winner at the 92nd Academy Awards
- Jeremy Ebobisse, professional soccer player for LAFC
- Georgia Engel, actress
- Florent Groberg, Medal of Honor recipient
- Jonathan Hadary, actor
- Jeffrey C. Hall, Nobel Prize in Medicine recipient, geneticist, and chronobiologist
- Colleen Haskell, actress and season one Survivor contestant
- Stephen Herek, film director and Broadway producer
- John Michael Higgins, actor and director
- Tommy Keene, singer and songwriter
- Ariana Kelly, politician, Maryland House of Delegates
- Candace Kovacic-Fleischer, law professor
- John Kronstadt, district judge
- Adriana Kugler, economist, member of the Federal Reserve Board of Governors, former executive director of the World Bank
- Tim Kurkjian, ESPN baseball reporter and analyst
- Roy Lee, film producer
- Jeffrey S. Lehman, former Cornell University president, scholar, and attorney
- Nils Lofgren, rock musician, member of the E Street Band (did not graduate)
- Rudy Maxa, host and producer of PBS travel shows
- Matt McCoy, actor
- Caroline Miller, professional soccer player
- Matt Murray, journalist, editor-in-chief of The Washington Post
- Alain Nu, mentalist and magician
- Jody Olsen, Peace Corps director
- Carl Pope, former Sierra Club executive director
- James Risen, investigative reporter and author
- Francesco Sani, professional volleyball player for Italy men's national volleyball team
- Tommy Smith, U.S. National Rugby Sevens player
- Cal Thomas, syndicated columnist, radio commentator, and author
- Brian Transeau, electronic musician and composer
- David J. Williams, science fiction and video game creator
- Gedion Zelalem, professional soccer player
- Gerald Zerkin, senior assistant federal public defender who defended Zacarias Moussaoui
