= Charlotte Hunter Arley =

American lawyer

- Born: April 2, 1912; Springfield, Massachusetts
- Died: March 7, 2006 (aged 93); Reno, Nevada
- Education: Northeastern University School of Law
- Occupation: Lawyer
- Known for: The Petticoats Trial

Charlotte Hunter Arley (April 2, 1912 – March 7, 2006) was a lawyer who participated in the Petticoats Trial, which was the first trial in Reno, Nevada where two female advocates faced off against each other.

== Personal life ==
Arley was born in Springfield, Massachusetts to Ukrainian Jewish parents, who had emigrated to the United States in 1910. Her parents, Morris and Charlotte Hunter, had four children: three daughters and one son. Arley was an avid traveler who worked in the Yosemite National Park gift shop in the mid-1930s. She got married in Hawaii, where she was one of the last people to leave the island before the commencement of World War II. Her marriage would end in divorce. She later moved to Reno, Nevada to follow her father. In Reno, she met and married Jacques Arley, a former member of the French Resistance. They lived in Portland, Oregon for fifteen years, but she moved back to Reno after Jacques died.

== Legal Practice ==
She graduated high school early, and at sixteen, Arley enrolled in Northeastern University School of Law, but she was too young to take the Bar when she graduated in 1932. She volunteered in a legal clinic, and worked three other jobs, until she was old enough to take and pass the Massachusetts Bar in 1935. After passing the Bar, she worked in the legal department at the Federal Land Bank, where she was the only female lawyer. After moving to Reno, she was admitted to the Nevada Bar in 1947. Only two other women passed the bar that year, and only two other women were practicing in Reno at the time. She was a plaintiff's attorney, who litigated divorce, personal injury, and criminal cases. She appealed several cases to the Nevada Supreme Court and secured several victories. In 1949, she represented Reno at the International Federation of Women Lawyers in Rome, Italy.

In 1952, she began to represent a client in a matter that would become known as the Petticoats Trial. The press selected the name of a woman's garment because it was the first trial in Washoe County with opposing female advocates. The defendant was represented by Nada Novokovich, another female lawyer. It was also the first jury trial for both Arley and Novokovich. Arley's client alleged that he was pushed off of a bar stool and brought a lawsuit in state court. Arley won the case and the client was awarded $3,000. In 2007, Arley was honored with a plaque in the Judge John S. Belford's courtroom where the Petticoats Trial was argued.

In 1989, Arley was the first woman to be honored as an outstanding woman attorney in Northern Nevada. She was selected unanimously. Arley continued to practice law in her eighties.
