= Charles William Woodward =

American judge

Charles William Woodward (February 21, 1895 - May 16, 1969). was an American jurist who served Chief Judge of Maryland's Sixth Judicial Court and a member of its bench from 1932 until 1955.

== Background ==
Born in Jackson, Georgia, Woodward graduated from the University of Georgia. He moved to Maryland in 1915 and taught mathematics and history at Briarley Hall Military Academy in Poolesville. Later, he served in the US Army (1916-1919), advancing from the rank of private to infantry captain.

After Army service, Woodward earned a Bachelor of Laws degree from George Washington University in 1922, and was admitted to the Maryland Bar the following year. He practiced law in Montgomery County, Maryland until 1929 when Governor Albert Ritchie appointed him judge of the Montgomery County Police Court in Rockville.

== Sixth Judicial Circuit Court ==
In 1932, Ritchie appointed Woodward to the bench of the Sixth Judicial Court comprising both Montgomery and Frederick Counties. He was re-elected to the bench in 1934 to serve a 15-year term. In 1945, following a reorganization of the Courts, Woodward became Chief Judge of Maryland's Sixth Judicial Circuit.

Woodward retired in 1955

== Montgomery County High School ==
In 1966, Charles W. Woodward High School was named in Woodward's honor. In early 1969, he addressed the students and faculty.

Woodward died from cancer later that year.
