= Shalanda Baker =

American government official and academic (born 1976)

Shalanda Helen Baker
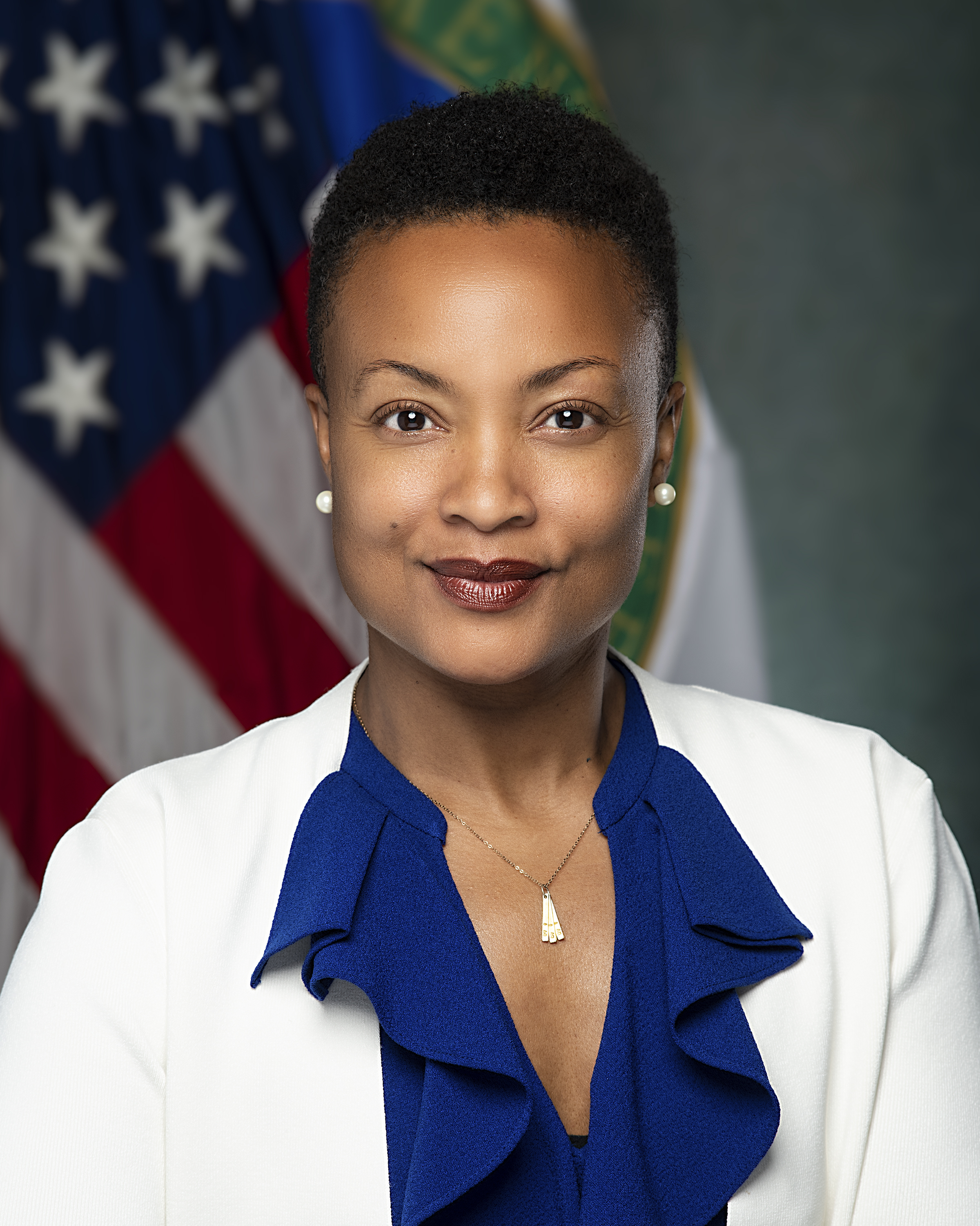
- U.S. Department of Energy official portrait, 2022

Director of the Office of Economic Impact and Diversity United States Department of Energy
- In office August 1, 2022 – June 21, 2024
- President: Joe Biden
- Preceded by: James E. Campos

Personal details
- Education: United States Air Force Academy (BS); Northeastern University School of Law (JD); University of Wisconsin Law School (LLM)

Shalanda Helen Baker (born December 24, 1976) is an American legal scholar and U.S. Air Force veteran who was director of the Office of Economic Impact and Diversity at the US Department of Energy in the Biden administration from 2022 to 2024. In 2024, she was appointed as the inaugural Vice Provost for Sustainability and Climate Action at the University of Michigan at Ann Arbor.

== Early life and education ==
Baker received a Bachelor of Science degree in Political Science from the United States Air Force Academy. Baker played in the 1998 Women's Rugby World Cup. She received her Juris Doctor degree from Northeastern University School of Law, and later received her Master of Laws degree from University of Wisconsin Law School.

== Career ==
Baker worked as an Air Force officer during the “Don't Ask, Don't Tell” era, and pursued an honorable discharge after her personal situation put her at odds with the policy. She was a professor of law at the University of San Francisco and the University of Hawaii at Manoa, before joining professor of law, professor of public policy and urban affairs at Northeastern University.

Baker is the co-founder of the Initiative for Energy Justice and the author of the book Revolutionary Power: An Activist’s Guide to the Energy Transition.

=== Biden administration ===
On April 22, 2021, President Joe Biden nominated Baker to be the Director of the Office of Economic Impact and Diversity at the United States Department of Energy. Hearings were held before the Senate Energy Committee on her nomination on June 8, 2021. The committee favorably reported her nomination to the Senate floor on July 22, 2021. Baker's nomination expired at the end of the year and was returned to President Biden on January 3, 2022.

President Biden re-sent her nomination the next day. On March 8, 2022, the committee favorably reported her nomination to the Senate floor. She was confirmed by the Senate on June 7, 2022. Baker stepped down on June 21, 2024. Some of the policies within her direction were included in the Justice40 program.
