= Marie-Therese Connolly =

American lawyer

- Education: Stanford University (BA); Northeastern University School of Law (JD)
- Occupation: lawyer
- Known for: Elder Justice Act

Marie-Therese Connolly is an American lawyer, Coordinator at the Elder Justice and Nursing Home Initiative, at the US Department of Justice, and Senior Trial Counsel, in the Civil Division. She won a 2011 MacArthur Fellowship.

== Book ==
In July 2023 Hachette books published Connolly's book The Measure of Our Age: Navigating Care, Safety, Money & Meaning Later in Life

== Life ==
She graduated from Stanford University with a B.A. in 1981, and from Northeastern University School of Law with a J.D. in 1984. She helped draft the Elder Justice Act.

She is Senior Scholar at the Woodrow Wilson International Center for Scholars. She is a Director of Life Long Justice at the Appleseed Foundation.
