= James E. Campos =

American businessman (born 1972)

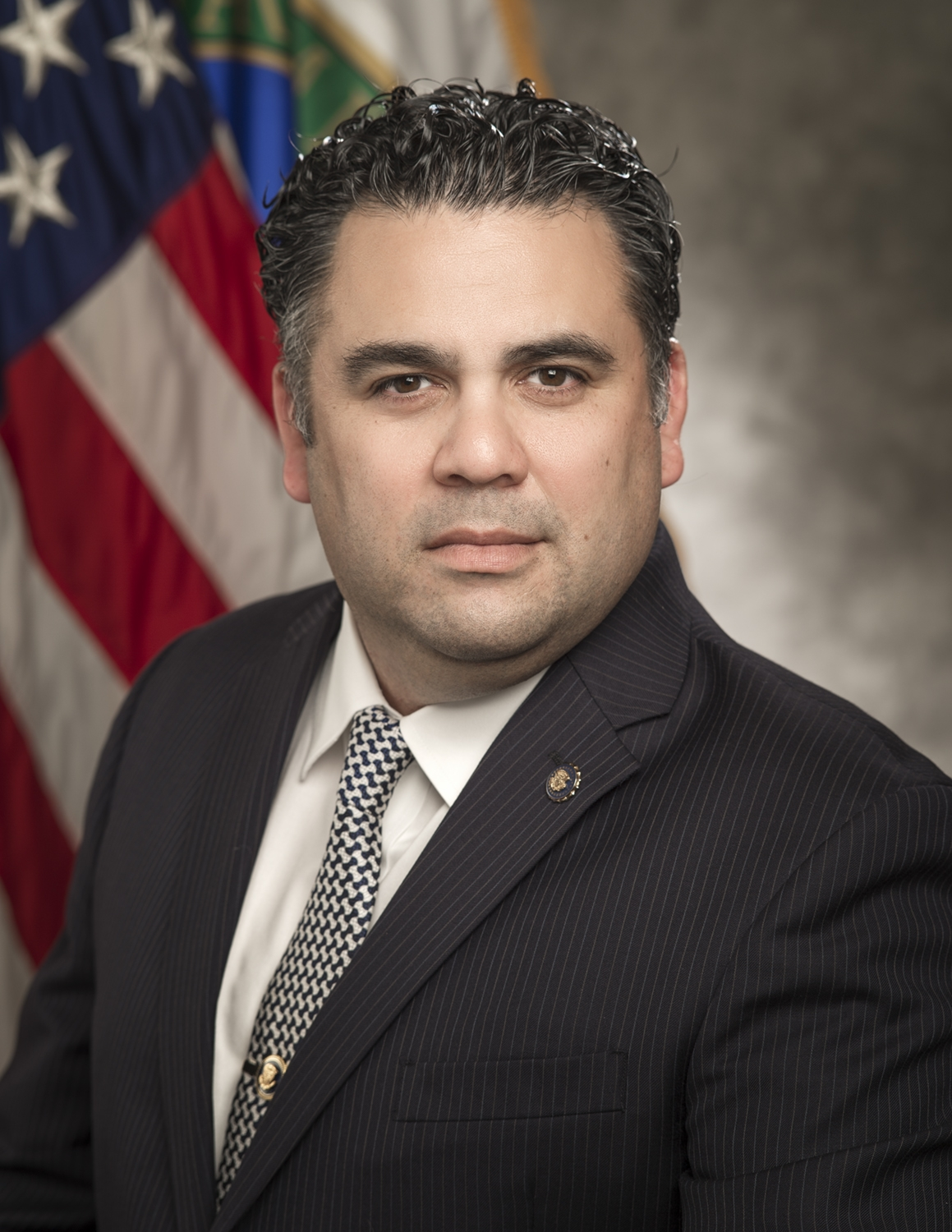

Director of the Office of Economic Impact and Diversity United States Department of Energy
- In office April 9, 2018 – January 20, 2021
- President: Donald Trump
- Preceded by: Andre H. Sayles (acting)
- Succeeded by: Ann Augustyn (acting); Shalanda Baker

Personal details
- Born: October 19, 1972 (age 53)
- Party: Republican
- Parent(s): Joseph & Christina Campos
- Relatives: Laurie (sister), Vickie (sister) and Joe (brother)
- Education: University of Maryland (B.A., M.S.); University of Glasgow (M.B.A.); Cornell University (Graduate Certificate in Human Resources)
- Website: Department of Energy website

James Edward Campos (born October 19, 1972) is an American businessman who currently serves as President of Red Post Energy Futures at Red Post Energy. He previously served as Deputy Secretary of Commerce and Trade in Virginia under the Youngkin administration, with a portfolio focused on energy development, innovation and advancement and as the Executive Director of the Virginia Tobacco Region Revitalization Commission, an economic development organization focused on Southern and Southwest Virginia. Campos served in the Trump administration as the Director of the Office of Economic Impact and Diversity at the United States Department of Energy (DOE) between 2018 and 2021. Campos was nominated to the position on March 2, 2018 by President Donald Trump and confirmed 96-2 by the United States Senate on April 9, 2018.

== Career ==
=== Early political career ===
Campos worked on the 2004 campaigns of Brian Sandoval and George W Bush as president. In 2005, Campos was the state director of the Young Hispanic Republican Association. In 2006, Campos worked as the Minority Coalitions Outreach Coordinator on Nevada Republican gubernatorial nominee Jim Gibbons campaign and then as Director of Governor Gibbons office in Las Vegas.after the election.

In February 2007, Campos was appointed as the statewide Commissioner of the Nevada Consumer Affairs Division (NCAD).

In 2008, Campos was the Nevada Hispanic Chair for Republican presidential nominee John McCain’s campaign.

In March 2009, the duties of the NCAD were absorbed by the Nevada Attorney General's Office. Subsequently, Campos was named Deputy Administrator of Workforce Solutions in the Nevada Department of Employment, Training & Rehabilitation.

In 2012, Campos was named as a member of Republican presidential nominee Mitt Romney’s National Hispanic Steering Committee.

From March 2015 to April 2018, Campos served as a State Regulator on the Nevada Taxicab Commission.

Campos has held several additional state-wide gubernatorial appointments in Nevada, including:

- Nevada’s Equal Rights Commission (April 2011 to 2015);
- Nevada’s Judicial Selection Commission (temporary member) (July 2011);
- Governor’s Workforce Investment Sector Council on Gaming, Tourism & Entertainment (Jan. 2014);
- Governor’s Workforce Investment Sector Councils on Mining and Minerals (Feb. 2014); and
- Governor’s Office of Economic Development’s International Trade Council (May 2014 to October 2017).

=== Director of the Office of Economic Impact and Diversity ===
As Director, Campos oversaw the Office of Economic Impact and Diversity and the Office of Civil Rights and Diversity.

Campos also served as the DOE’s Equal Employment Opportunity Director and was the Department’s designee on the White House Opportunity and Revitalization Council.

=== Appointment by Virginia Governor Youngkin to Virginia Tobacco Commission ===
Virginia Governor Glenn Youngkin appointed Campos Acting Executive Director of the Virginia Tobacco Region Revitalization Commission in January 2023. He also served in Youngkin's administration as Deputy Secretary of Commerce and Trade under Secretary Caren Merrick. Campos served in these roles through the end of the Youngkin administration.

=== Career outside politics ===
Campos currently serves on the Advisory Board of Energy Network Media Group. Campos previously served as the Senior Adviser on Economic Development and Government Relations to President Bart Patterson of Nevada State College. From July 2009 to October 2011, Campos was the Director of Renewable Energy Initiatives and Government Relations for the College of Southern Nevada.

== Awards ==
In 2006, Campos received the "Professional Service Award" from the Las Vegas Latin Chamber of Commerce. In 2010, he received the group's "Young Professional of the Year" award. In 2011, Campos was recognized in the Las Vegas “In Business Magazine’s” top five most influential Hispanics in business. Campos was also named as one of the "Most Influential Hispanics in Nevada" by Nevada Hispanic Magazine in 2015, 2016, and 2018. In 2022, Campos received the OilMan/Woman Magazine Honorary Person of the Year Award. In 2024, Campos received the Bridge Builder/Person of the Year Award from the Virginia Hispanic Chamber of Commerce. In 2025, Campos received the Leadership in Business, Energy & Economic Impact award from the Minority Business RoundTable, a national, 501c3 nonprofit organization for CEOs of Small, Multinational, Veteran, and Women businesses consisting of top-tier American companies, representing every industry sector.

== Personal life ==
Campos's father, Joseph, served in the United States Navy during the Korean War, followed by fifteen additional years in the United States Navy Reserve. Joseph then worked in Latin America as a federal employee. Campos grandparents were Mexican and immigrated to the United States in the early 1900s.

Campos was engaged to Irma Aguirre as of 2018.
