= Northwood High School (Maryland) =

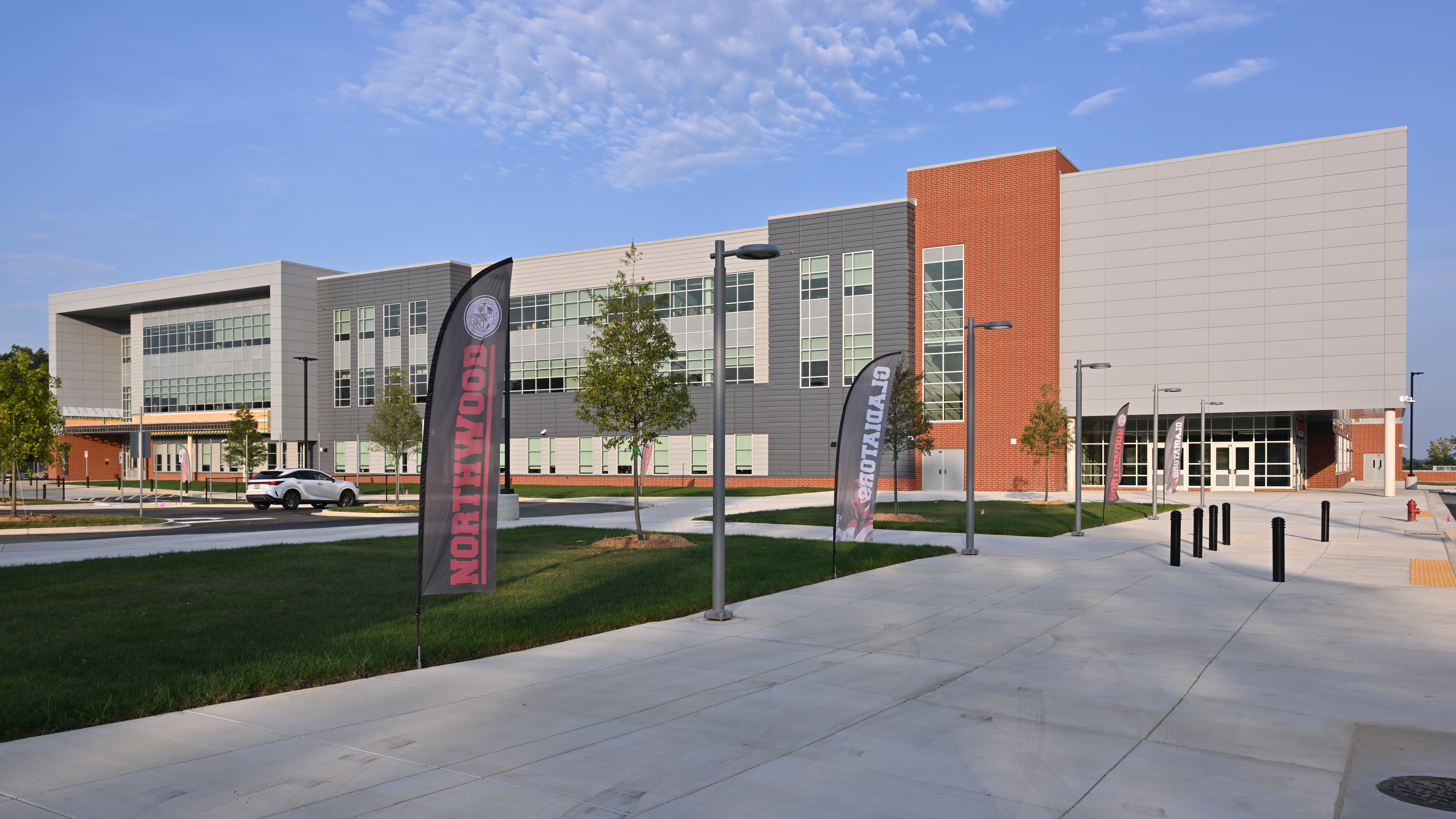
- Northwood High School at Charles W. Woodward High School holding school during its reconstruction in August 2024

Location
- 919 University Boulevard West; Silver Spring, Maryland 20901; United States; 39°2′6″N 77°1′25″W

Information
- Type: Public high school
- Opened: 1956; 70 years ago
- Closed: 1985; reopened 2004; 22 years ago
- School district: Montgomery County Public Schools
- CEEB code: 210947
- NCES School ID: 240048001366
- Principal: Jonathan L. Garrick
- Teaching staff: 129.00 FTE (2024–24)
- Grades: 9-12
- Gender: Co-educational
- Enrollment: 1,745 (2023-24)
- Student to teacher ratio: 13.53
- Colors: Red and black
- Mascot: Gladiator
- Rival: Montgomery Blair High School
- Newspaper: Red and Black
- Website: montgomeryschoolsmd.org/schools/northwoodhs/

Northwood High School is a public high school in Kemp Mill, Maryland, United States, with a Silver Spring postal address. It is part of the Montgomery County Public Schools system, and is one of five high schools in the Downcounty Consortium.

Northwood High School opened in 1956. In 1985, it was closed due to changing demographics in the area before reopening 19 years later, in 2004.

In 2024, the school began being rebuilt. During the rebuilding, students are attending Charles W. Woodward High School in Rockville, Maryland. The Gladiators are set to return to their expanded facility in Silver Spring starting in the 2027-2028 school year.

== History ==
=== 20th century ===
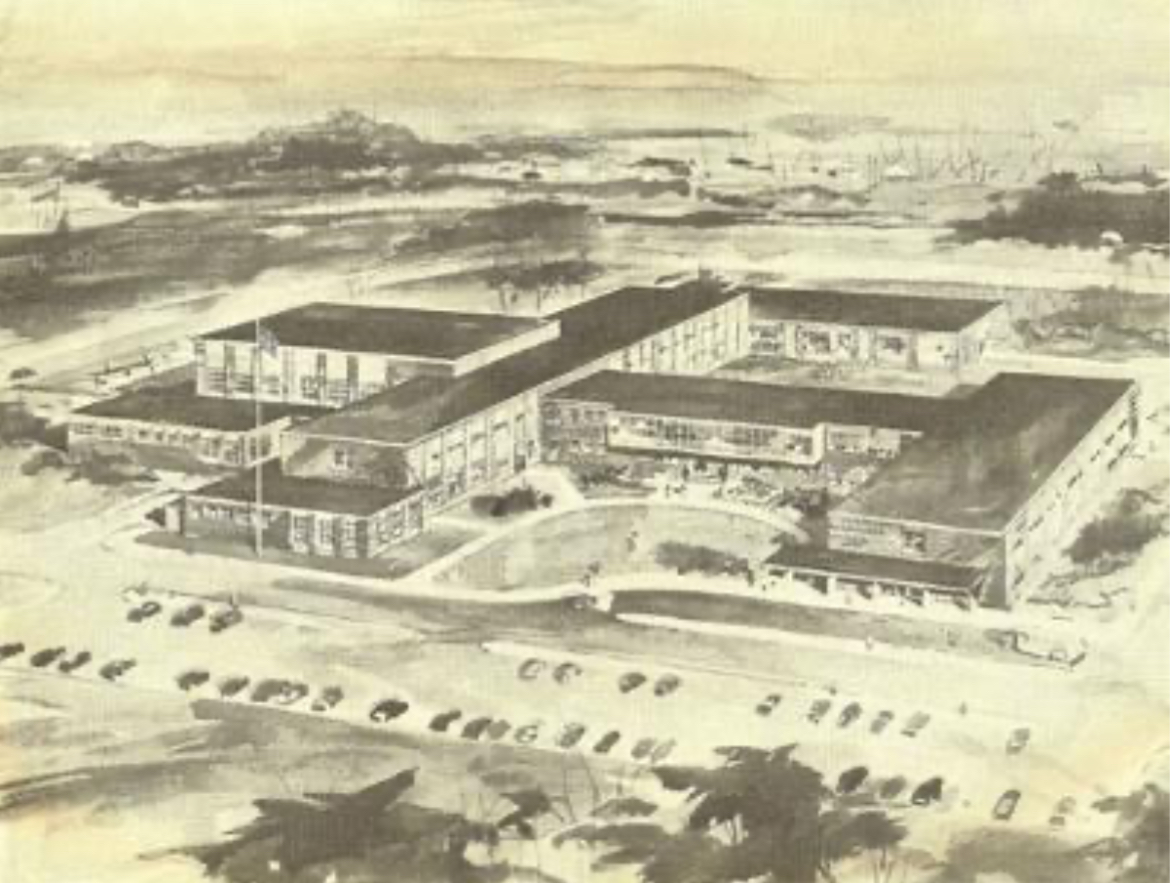
Northwood High School in 1957, the year it opened

In 1955, in order to relieve overcrowding in local schools adjacent to major federal installations or defense projects, U.S. President Dwight D. Eisenhower signed Title 45 Public Law 81-874, "Assistance for School Construction," which provided $1.5 million to Montgomery County, Maryland for school construction. The county decided to build Northwood High School along 30 acres on Old Bladensburg Road, later known as University Boulevard, in Silver Spring, Maryland, and the school was planned to open in fall 1956. The two-story brick, tile, and glass rambler cost $1.9 million to construct and had an initial student capacity of 1,425.

At its dedication in 1957, Arthur S. Adams, president of the American Council on Education, described the school as a "magnificent building" to a crowd of 1,000 visitors. The Northwood area grew prior to construction. The new school became a combination junior/senior high school named Northwood Junior Senior High School. Its new principal was Ted A. Bartlett, a Harvard University-educated World War II veteran who served as the former high school basketball coach at Winchester High School in Winchester, Massachusetts.

When the school year began in 1956, there was no working bell system, no mirrors in the bathrooms, no lockers, and no cafeteria. They used whistles to mark the start and end of class periods.

On February 1, 1960, Harold R. Packard replaced Bartlett as principal. Eugene R. Smoley subsequently became principal in 1972. In 1977, Smoley was replaced by Bobby J. Mullis, who retired when the school closed in 1985.

==== Closing ====
Beginning in 1981, the closing of Northwood High School was discussed and voted on three times by the Montgomery County School Board. In 1985, it was finally ordered to close in a contested decision, which aimed to alleviate the concentration of minorities at Montgomery Blair High School. A nonprofit group, Northwood Community Solidarity Inc, was established to fight the closure. After the closing, school trophies were given to students and alumni. Varsity athletic uniforms were sold to students for $1. The Northwood Indian headdress was donated to Wheaton Library for display.

From 1987 to 2004, Northwood was used to hold students from other high schools during renovations.

=== 21st century ===
In 2004, due to a growing student population in the area, the school reopened. The school's original mascot had been the Indians. In September 2001, however, a vote by the Board of Education banned ethnic and race-based team mascots at county schools. Students from the first graduating class of the repopening "Class of 2008" chose the gladiators as the school's new mascot.

==== Reopening ====
Prior to the reopening the funds saved by the Northwood Community Solidarity for 20 years, $8,500, was donated to Northwood in memory of the late Bobby Mullis.

In 2008, the school celebrated their first graduation ceremony since 1985. The campus now serves all four classes 9-12 and approximately has 1,400 students. In 2009, the increase in the school's enrollment resulted in moving from a Division 2A to a Division 3A school.

As of the 2023–24 school year, the school had a student enrollment of 1,745 students and 120 faculty on an FTE basis for a student–teacher ratio of 13.53, according to National Center for Education Statistics data.

== Athletics ==
As of 2018, Northwood students participate in 45 teams across 18 sports for the fall, winter, and spring seasons. Students play on both varsity and junior varsity levels and hosted girls', boys', and co-ed teams. Sports include baseball, basketball, bocce, cross country running, field hockey, football, golf, lacrosse, pom-pom, racquetball, side cheer, soccer, softball, swimming, tennis, track and field, volleyball, and wrestling. In 2023, the Northwood Bocce Ball team won Maryland's state championship, marking the school's first state championship in a sport in over four decades.

Prior to its closing in 1985, Northwood had a number of division, county, regional, and state championships in a variety of sports. Don Greenberg was an all-county football and baseball player in the 1973 and 1974 seasons. In 1975, Northwood baseball coach Brady Straub led the team to a Maryland state championship.

== MC^2 ==
Northwood High School has a special program in collaboration with Montgomery College called MC^2. It allows students of the program to earn college credit while still in high school by taking Advanced Placement courses or classes taught by real college professors from Montgomery College. Students have the opportunity to earn an Associate degree in high school.

In ninth grade, students can choose to take AP US History but the courses they take are the same as a non-MC^2 student. Then, in 10th grade, students take Montgomery College classes for one class period of the day. They must also choose to take AP US Government or AP Psychology for additional credit. In 11th grade, they spend two class periods taking Montgomery College classes, and AP English. They can choose to take AP World History, AP Biology, or AP Chemistry. Finally, in 12th grade, rather than taking courses at Northwood, students are attend Montgomery College for the entire school day.

== School facilities ==
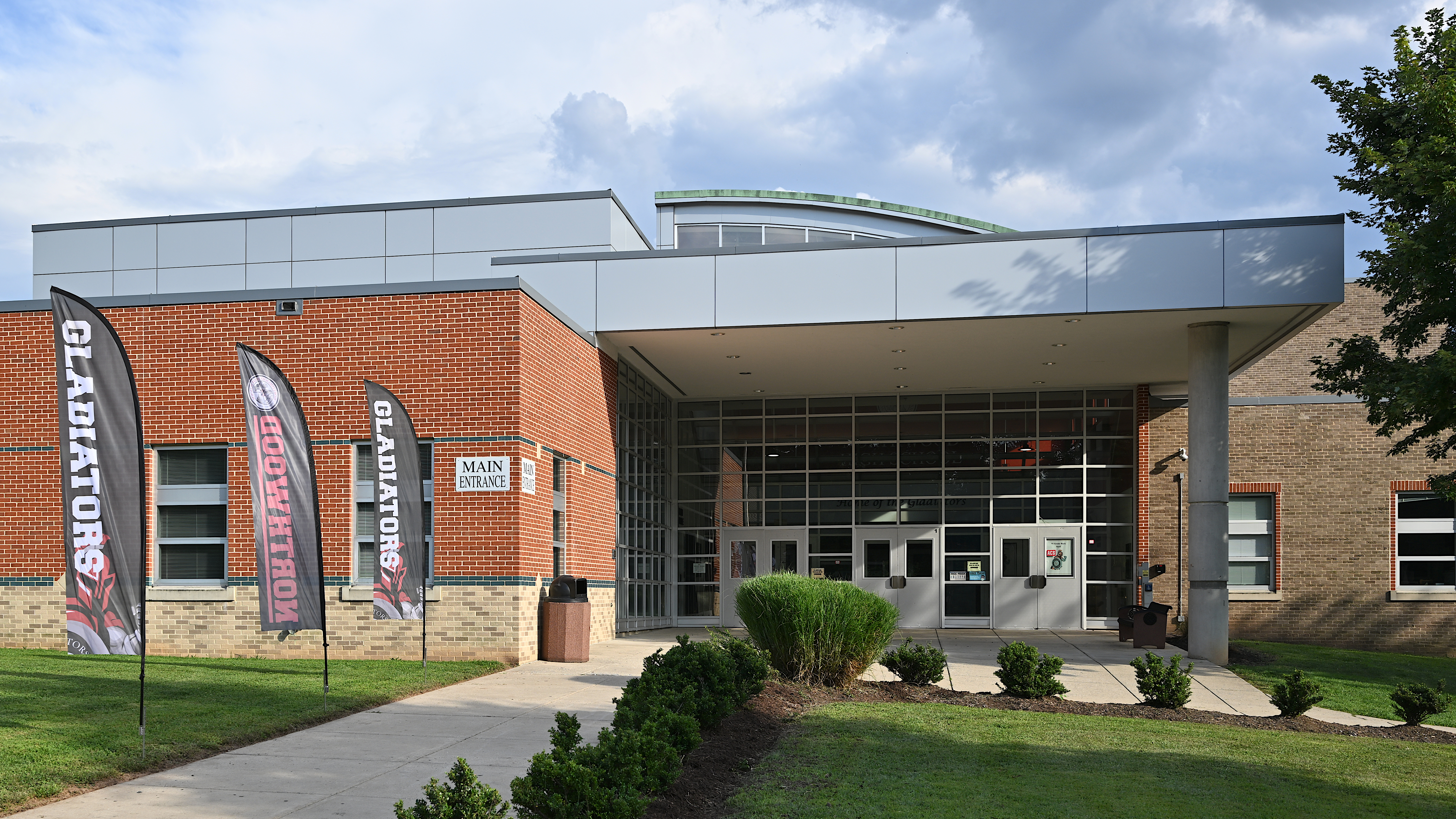
The Northwood High School campus before its rebuilding

The school is located at the northeast corner of University Boulevard West and Arcola Avenue in Silver Spring, Maryland. The school's architect, William N. Denton Jr., designed a classic H-shaped structure. The original school opened with 55 classrooms, 11 administrative offices, a large gym, and 108 seat library and cafeteria seating 456. Before the end of the first year, plans were made to add an additional 14 new classrooms. Northwood has a recently remodeled multipurpose stadium where their football, soccer, track and lacrosse teams play, named after former Northwood Technology Education, (mostly Electronics) teacher David Kaplan who became an activist lobbying to keep the school open in 1985. The athletic area of Northwood also includes two baseball fields, a track, and a concessions area to the left of the main stands of Kaplan Stadium. The school has a Media Center that mainly serves as a library. There is also a band room, alternate music room, a full wellness center, and a film room that is the location of Northwood's television and radio station, WNHS.

=== New Northwood Building ===
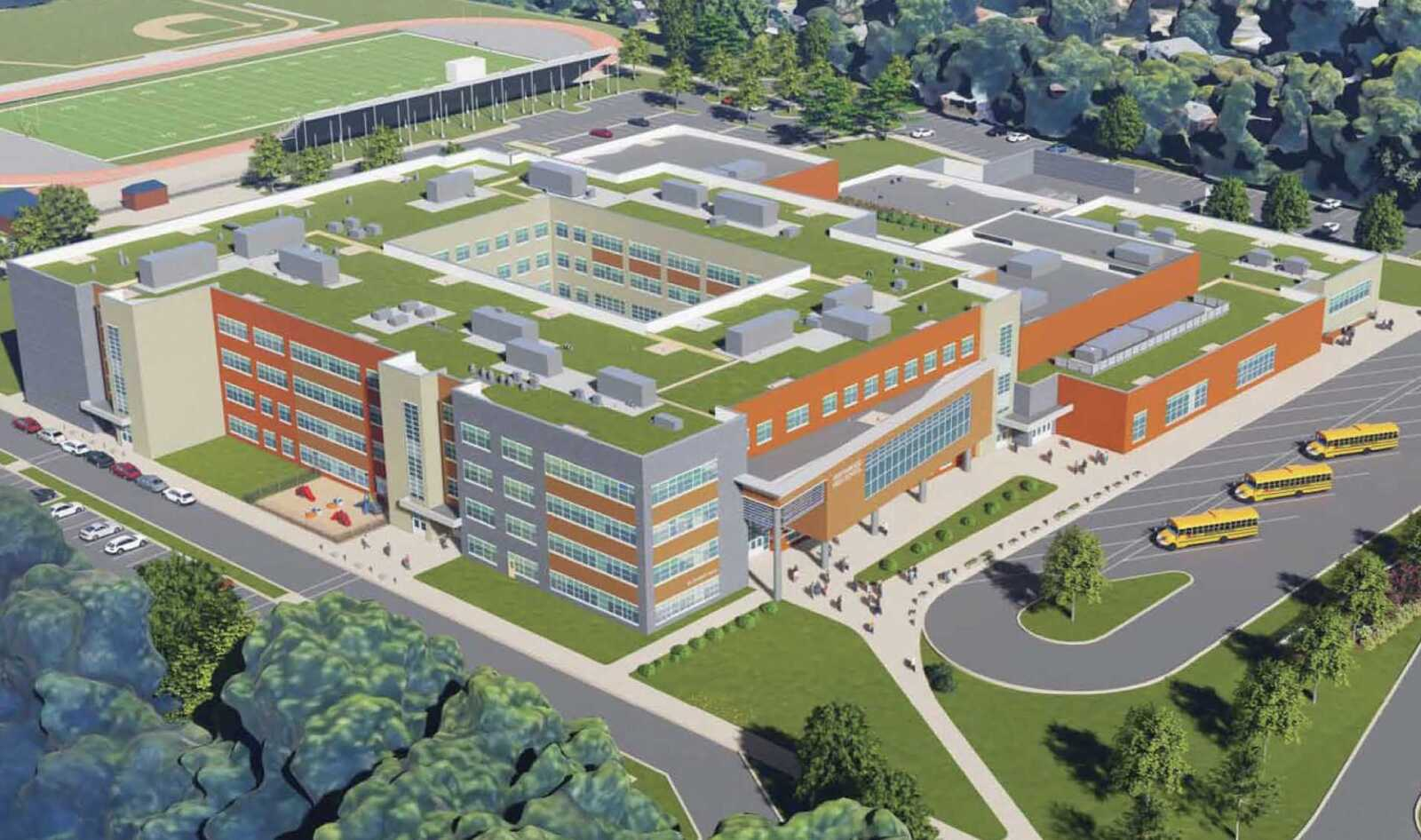
Rendering of New Northwood

To address crowding in the Downcounty Consortium, an addition and facility upgrades are planned for the high school. This expansion includes additional classrooms, reconfiguration of existing spaces and upgrades to building system and will bring accommodate roughly 2,700 students, an increase of 1,200. During the upgrade, the school will operate out of the campus of Charles W. Woodward High School. This upgrade was supposed to be completed by 2025, but due to supply chain issues and COVID-19, it got delayed until summer 2027.

On April 24, 2024, at 2 p.m., the Northwood High School Community planned a walkout to protest the delayed construction, incomplete school, and early start time for Northwood at Charles Woodward High School. MCPS did change the start time from 7:20 to 7:40 AM, added more school bus routes, and changed existing ones to arrive later. But the staff and students still saw many issues with their temporary holding school such as no auditorium or sports fields.

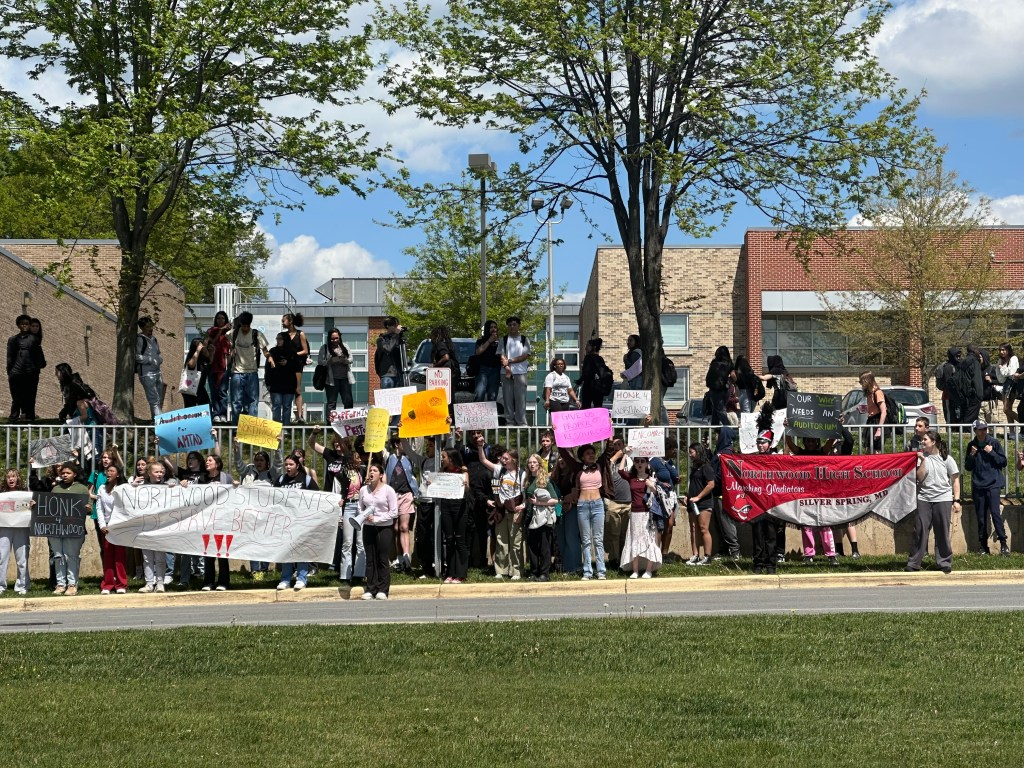
Northwood High School students protesting the situation at Charles W. Woodward High School

MCPS hired Samaha Accosiates, PC to be the architect for the new Northwood High School and Whiting-Turner Contracting Company to demolish old Northwood and build new Northwood.

The asbestos removal for Northwood High School started in June 2024 and was expected to be completed on August 16, 2024. But the asbestos removal took longer than expected and got completed in October 2024. The demolition of the school followed after the asbestos removal and it started in October 2024 and the school is expected to be fully rebuilt in 2027.

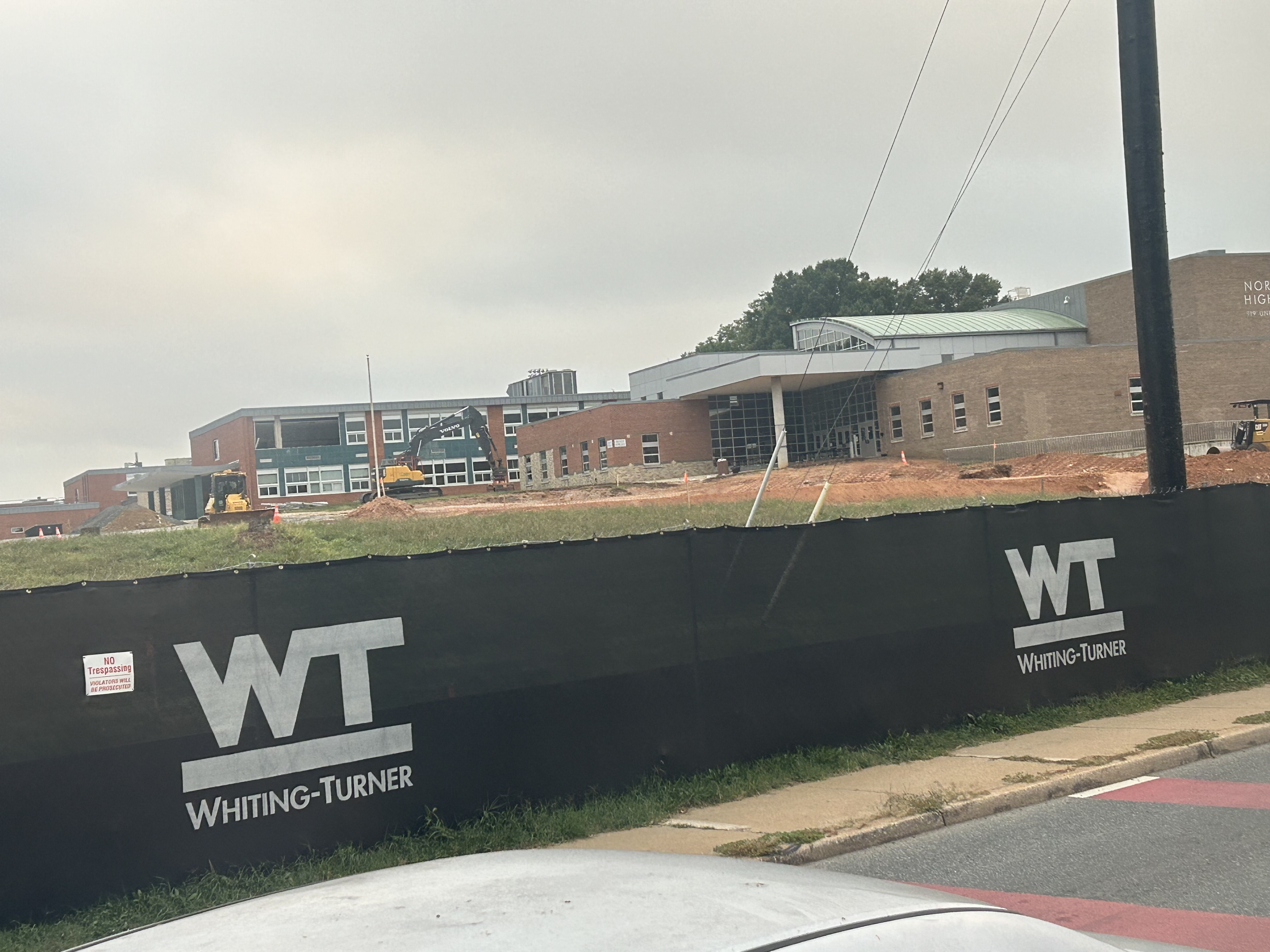
Northwood High School during its demolition in September 2024

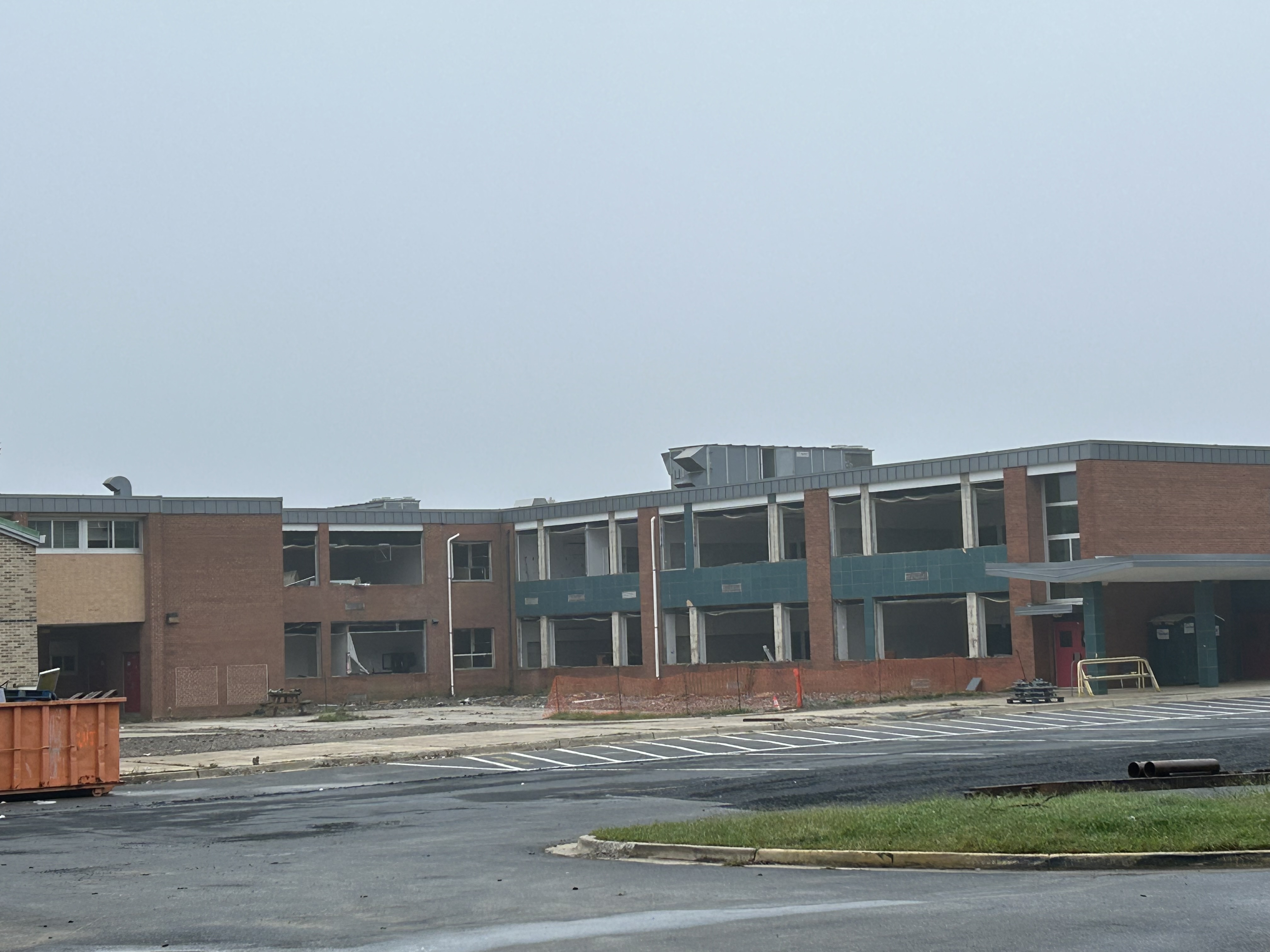
The left side of the school during its September 2024 demolition

== WNHS ==
During the early 1970s, WNHS was a low-power AM radio station, used for broadcasting home football games. WNHS became the television and radio station at Northwood high school. Unique throughout the county to Northwood High School, WNHS performs a live news show broadcast to students and faculty for the first twenty minutes of every school day. The program also covers sporting and school-wide events, such as graduation and prom. Shortly after reopening, the program entered and won awards in video competitions.

== Notable alumni ==
- Jonathan Banks, television and film actor
- Alex Bazzie, former professional football player
- Jerry Ceppos, journalist and academic
- George Daly, music executive
- Matt Drudge, creator and editor of the Drudge Report
- Annie Leibovitz, photographer
- George Pelecanos, author (detective and noir fiction), television producer and a television writer (The Wire)
- Evelyn Rosenberg, international artist and developer of the technique of detonographics
