= Rashida Richardson =

American attorney and scholar

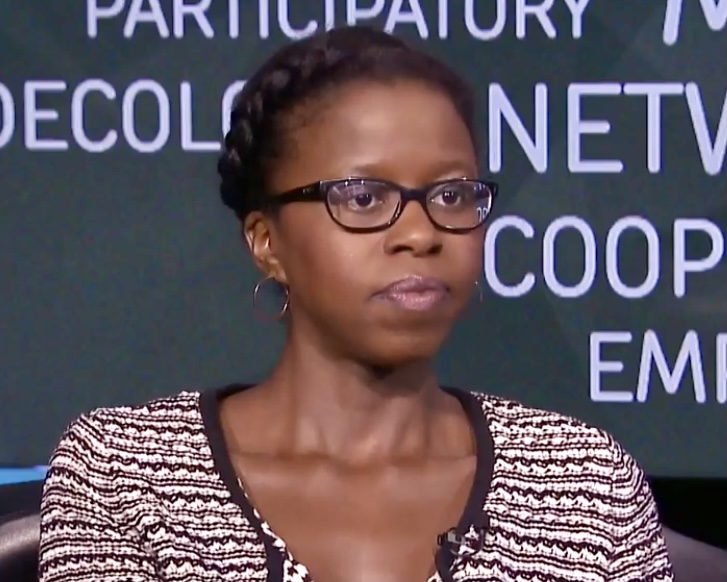
- Richardson in 2018
- Occupations: Scholar, assistant professor, attorney

Academic background
- Education: Wesleyan University (BA); Northeastern University School of Law (JD)

Academic work
- Discipline: Law and technology policy
- Website: https://www.rashidarichardson.com/

Rashida Richardson is a visiting scholar at Rutgers Law School and the Rutgers Institute for Information Policy and the Law and an attorney advisor to the Federal Trade Commission. She is also an assistant professor of law and political science at the Northeastern University School of Law and the Northeastern University Department of Political Science in the College of Social Sciences and Humanities.

Richardson previously was the director of policy research at the AI Now Institute, where she designed, implemented and coordinated research strategies and initiatives on law, policy, and civil rights. During her career as an attorney, researcher, and scholar, Richardson has engaged in science communication and public advocacy.

== Education ==
Richardson earned a BA with Honors from the College of Social Studies at Wesleyan University, and a JD from Northeastern University School of Law. She was an intern with Judge Charles R. Breyer of the US District Court for the Northern District of California, the law firm of Cowan, DeBeats, Abraham & Sheppard, and the Legal Aid Society.

== Career ==
Before joining The AI Now Institute, Richardson served as Legislative Counsel at the New York Civil Liberties Union and had worked as a staff attorney for The Center for HIV Law and Policy. She previously worked at Facebook and HIP Investor in San Francisco.

After her senior fellowship for digital innovation and democracy at the German Marshall Fund, she became a senior policy adviser for data and democracy at the Office of Science and Technology Policy in July 2021. She also joined the faculty at Northeastern Law as an assistant professor of law and political science with the School of Law and the Department of Political Science in the College of Social Sciences and Humanities in July 2021. In 2022, she began work as an attorney advisor for the Federal Trade Commission.

In March 2020, she joined the advisory board of the Electronic Privacy Information Center (EPIC). In March 2021, she joined the board of Lacuna Technologies to provide guidance on equity and data privacy issues.

== Advocacy ==
In 2018, as the director of policy research for the AI Now Institute, Richardson spoke at length with The Christian Science Monitor about the impacts and challenges of artificial intelligence, including a lack of transparency with the public about how the technology is used and a lack of technical expertise by municipalities in how the technology works or whether the results are biased or flawed. Richardson discussed similar concerns about facial recognition technology with NBC News in 2018 and CBS News in 2020. In 2019, Richardson spoke with the Detroit Free Press about the increasing use of artificial intelligence systems by governments across the United States, and extended her warnings to Canada when speaking with The Canadian Press. In 2019, Richardson spoke with Reuters about ethics and artificial intelligence, and expressed concerns about the priorities of Amazon.com, Facebook, Microsoft and others.

In 2019, Richardson testified before the U.S. Senate Subcommittee on Communications, Technology, Innovation, and the Internet in a hearing titled "Optimizing for Engagement: Understanding the Use of Persuasive Technology on Internet Platforms." In advance, she told Politico, "Government intervention is urgently needed to ensure consumers - particularly women, gender minorities and communities of color - are protected from discrimination and bias at the hands of AI systems."

In 2019, Karen Hao at MIT Technology Review profiled a study led by Richardson at the AI Now Institute, that according to Hao, "has significant implications for the efficacy of predictive policing and other algorithms used in the criminal justice system." In 2020, Richardson spoke with Hao about the use of predictive analytics applied to child welfare. Richardson also spoke with Will Douglas Heaven at MIT Technology Review for articles published in 2020 and 2021 about algorithmic bias problems in predictive policing programs, including her perspective that "political will" is needed to address the issues.

In 2020, as a visiting scholar at Rutgers Law School and senior fellow in the Digital Innovation and Democracy Initiative at the German Marshall Fund, Richardson spoke with The New York Times about resistance from American police departments in sharing details about technologies used, and the limited regulation of the technology, stating, "The only thing that can improve this black box of predictive policing is the proliferation of transparency laws."

In 2020, Richardson was featured in the documentary film "The Social Dilemma," directed by Jeff Orlowski and distributed by Netflix, that focuses on social media and algorithmic manipulation.

In 2021, she spoke with MIT Technology Review about algorithmic bias and issues related to predictive policing technology. Richardson explained both arrest data and victim reports can skew results, noting that with regard to victim reports, "if you are in a community with a historically corrupt or notoriously racially biased police department, that will affect how and whether people report crime."

== Selected works ==
- Richardson, R., & Cahn, A.F. (February 5, 2021). "States are failing on big tech and privacy — Biden must take the lead." The Hill.
- Richardson, R., & Kak, A. (September 11, 2020). "It’s time for a reckoning about this foundational piece of police technology." Slate.
- Kak, A., & Richardson, R. (May 1, 2020). "Artificial intelligence policies must focus on impact and accountability". Centre for International Governance Innovation.
- Richardson, R. (December 15, 2019). "Win the war against algorithms: Automated Decision Systems are taking over far too much of government". New York Daily News.
- Richardson, R. (ed.) (December 4, 2019). "Confronting black boxes: A shadow report of the New York City Automated Decision System Task Force". New York: AI Now Institute.
- Richardson, R., Schultz, J. M., & Southerland, V. M. (2019). Litigating algorithms 2019 US report: New challenges to government use of algorithmic decision systems. New York: AI Now Institute.
- Richardson, R., Schultz, J. M., & Crawford, K. (2019). Dirty data, bad predictions: How civil rights violations impact police data, predictive policing systems, and justice. New York University Law Review.
- Richardson, R. (December 12, 2017). New York City Takes on Algorithmic Discrimination. NYCLU.
