= Alex Bazzie =

Liberian gridiron football player (born 1990)

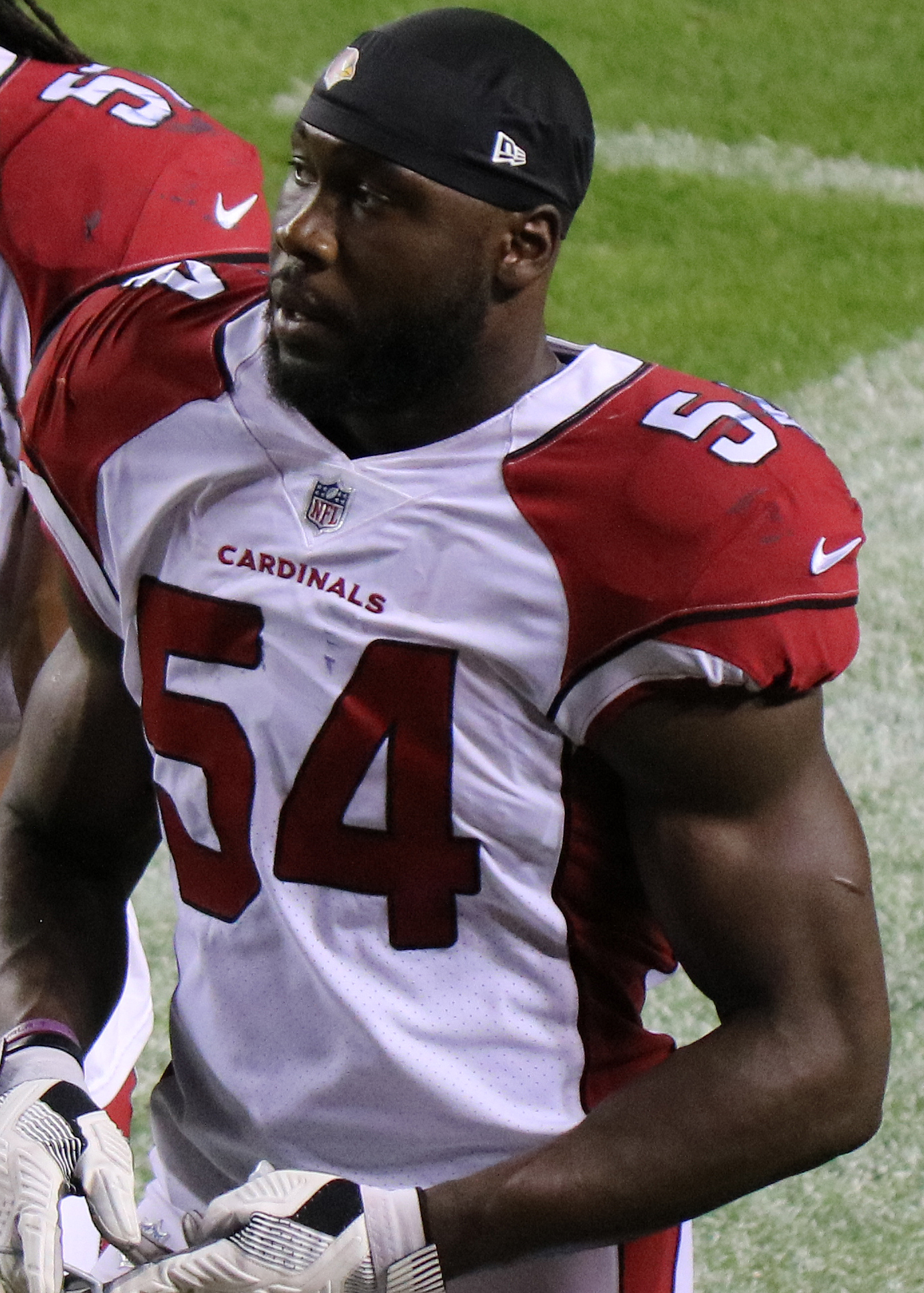
- Bazzie with the Arizona Cardinals in 2017

Profile
- Position: Defensive lineman

Personal information
- Born: 5 August 1990 (age 36); Liberia
- Listed height: 6 ft 1 in (1.85 m)
- Listed weight: 228 lb (103 kg)

Career information
- High school: Silver Spring (MD) Northwood
- College: Marshall
- NFL draft: 2014: undrafted

Career history

Playing
- BC Lions (2014–2016); Indianapolis Colts (2017)*; Carolina Panthers (2017)*; Arizona Cardinals (2017)*; BC Lions (2017); Edmonton Eskimos (2018–2019); Toronto Argonauts (2020)*; BC Lions (2021)
- * Offseason or practice squad member only

Coaching
- University of Charleston (2023) Defensive line coach

Awards and highlights
- CFL West All-Star (2016)
- Stats at Pro Football Reference
- Stats at CFL.ca

Alexander Bazzie (born 5 August 1990) is a Liberian former professional gridiron football defensive lineman who played for the BC Lions and Edmonton Eskimos of the Canadian Football League (CFL). He played college football at Marshall University. He was also a member of the Indianapolis Colts, Carolina Panthers and Arizona Cardinals of the National Football League (NFL), and the Toronto Argonauts of the CFL.

== Early life ==
Bazzie was born in Liberia and later moved to Maryland, where he attended Northwood High School in Silver Spring, Maryland. He enrolled at Fork Union Military Academy for a year after high school to improve his grades and meet eligibility requirements.

== Professional career ==
In late June 2014 Bazzie attended the Cleveland Browns rookie camp after going unselected in the 2014 NFL draft.

=== BC Lions (first stint) ===
Bazzie was signed by the BC Lions on 19 May 2014. He registered 43 tackles and ten sacks in 17 regular season games during the 2014 season. Bazzie continued to be a significant part of the Lions defense over the next two seasons, and through 3 seasons he had played in 50 games, recording 83 defensive tackles, 8 special teams tackles, 29 sacks, and 2 forced fumbles. He was set to become a free agent in February 2017, however the Lions released him in early January so he could pursue an NFL contract.

=== Indianapolis Colts ===
On 9 January 2017, Bazzie signed a reserve/future contract with the Indianapolis Colts. He was waived by the Colts on 1 May 2017.

=== Carolina Panthers ===
On 6 May 2017, Bazzie signed with the Carolina Panthers. He was waived on 30 May 2017.

=== Arizona Cardinals ===
On 6 June 2017, Bazzie signed with the Arizona Cardinals. He was waived on 2 September 2017.

=== BC Lions (second stint) ===
On 19 September 2017, Bazzie signed a one-year contract with the Lions.

=== Edmonton Eskimos ===
Bazzie spent the 2018 and 2019 CFL seasons with the Edmonton Eskimos.

=== Toronto Argonauts ===
As a free agent, Bazzie signed with the Toronto Argonauts on 11 February 2020. However, with the 2020 CFL season cancelled, he did not play in 2020 and he became a free agent upon the expiry of his contract on 9 February 2021.

=== BC Lions (third stint) ===
On 8 October 2021, it was announced that Bazzie had signed with the Lions. He played in six games where he had six defensive tackles and one sack and became a free agent again on 8 February 2022.

== Post-playing career ==
In 2023, Bazzie was the defensive line coach for the University of Charleston Golden Eagles. In January 2024, Bazzie was charged with entry of a building other than a dwelling after he allegedly broke into a United Bank ATM in Charleston, West Virginia.
