= Charles W. Woodward High School =

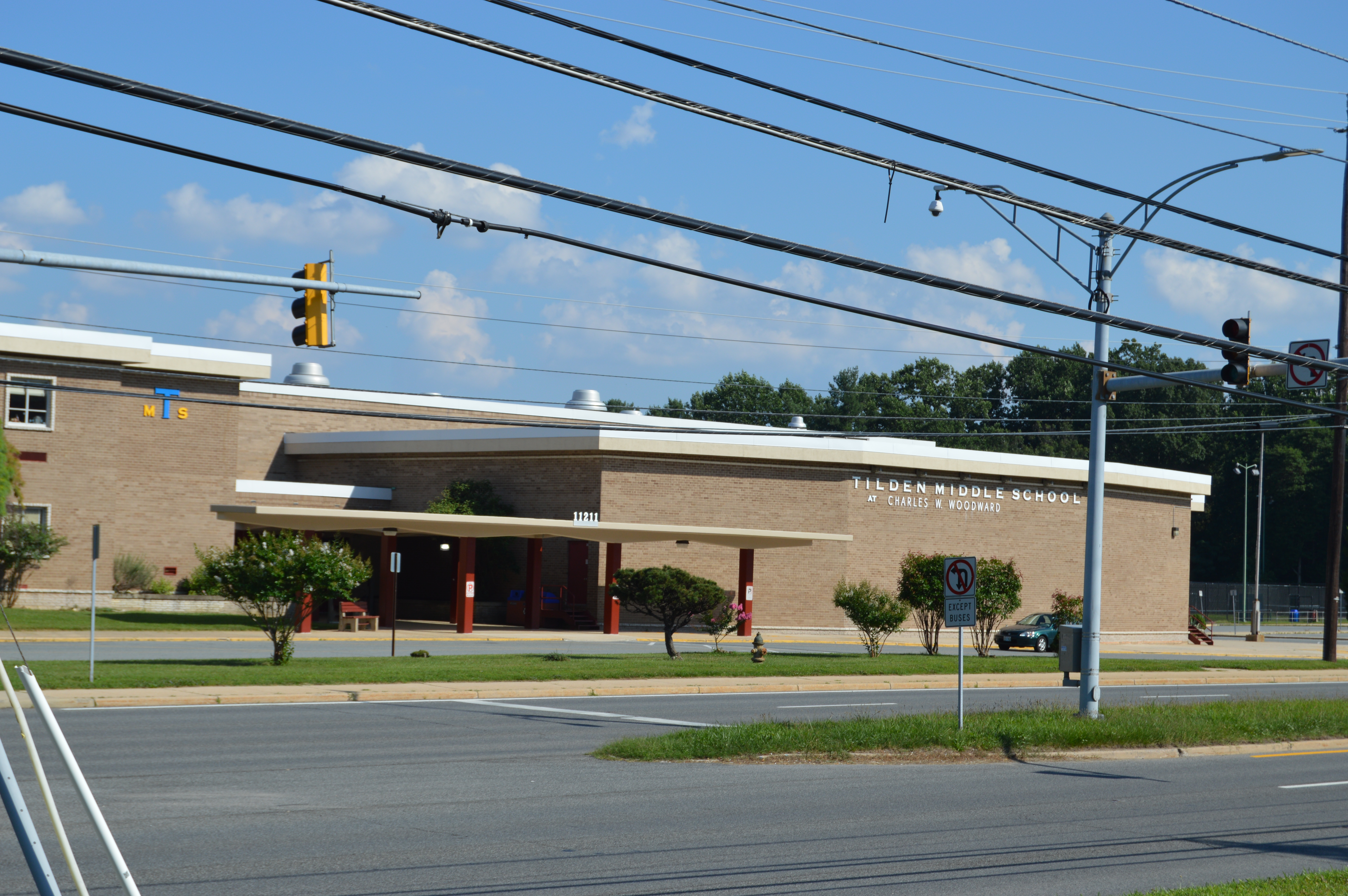

Location
- 11211 Old Georgetown Road; 39°2′18″N 77°7′19″W; North Bethesda, Maryland 20852; United States

Information
- Type: Public
- Established: 1966; 60 years ago
- Status: Closed
- Closed: 1987; 39 years ago
- School district: Montgomery County Public Schools
- Grades: 9–12
- Campus type: Suburban

Charles W. Woodward High School was a high school in North Bethesda, Maryland. It is set to reopen in 2027. The school's mascot will be the Wolves and colors are Purple, White and Gold. The school will also serve to the students living in the surrounding areas of Rockville, Bethesda and North Bethesda.

== History ==
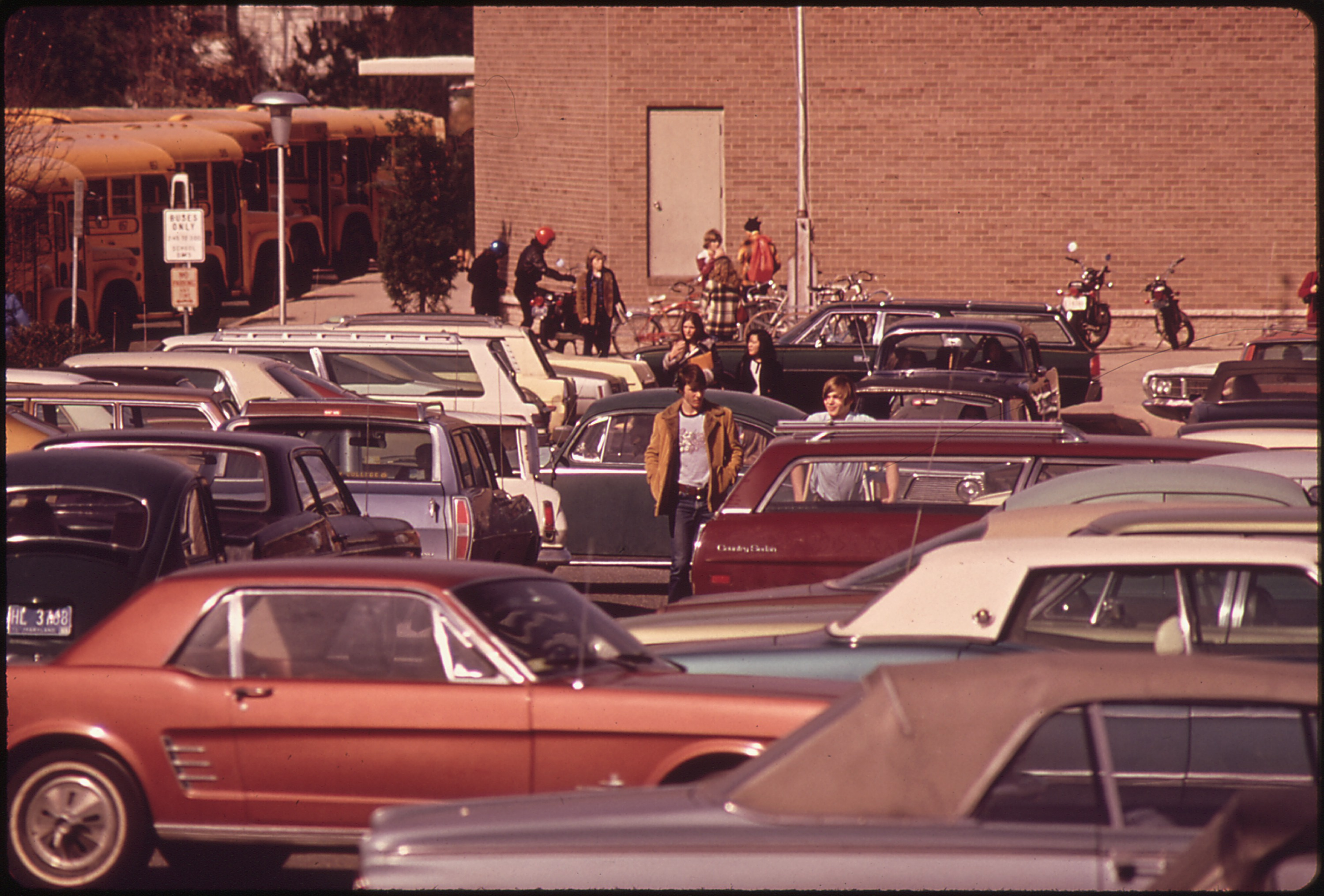
The school in May 1973

Charles W. Woodward High School opened in 1966. The school was named by the Montgomery County Board of Education for Judge Charles W. Woodward, Sr. (1895–1969), who served as Associate Judge and later as Chief Judge of the Sixth Judicial Circuit of Maryland from 1932 to 1955.

In 1987, Woodward and Walter Johnson High School were seeing reduced enrollment, so the county merged them into Walter Johnson, a larger building. Woodward's PTA supported closing the school.

The Woodward building was briefly used as swing space while Springbrook High School was being renovated.

The building was used to house Tilden Middle School starting in 1991. Tilden Middle School was then moved to its new location in the summer of 2020.

=== Construction ===
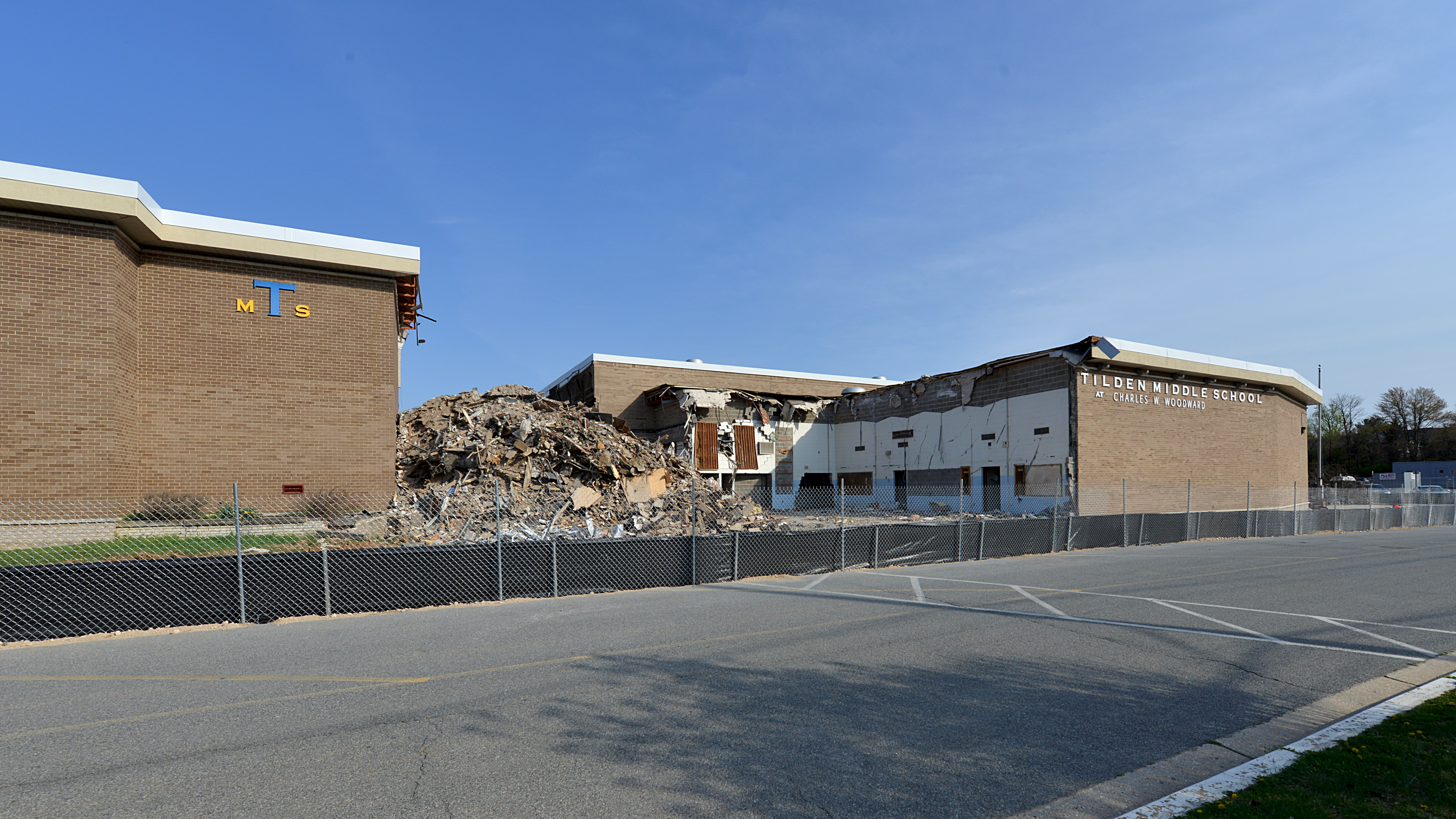
The demolition of Woodward High School / Tilden Middle School in April 2021

Beginning in summer of 2020, after Tilden Middle School left Woodward, the building began demolition for a new school to be built. The new school phase 1 construction was completed in summer 2024 and phase 2 is expected to be completed in summer of 2026.

Northwood High School began being housed at Charles Woodward High School starting in fall of 2024 while their school undergoes renovations.

=== Reopening ===
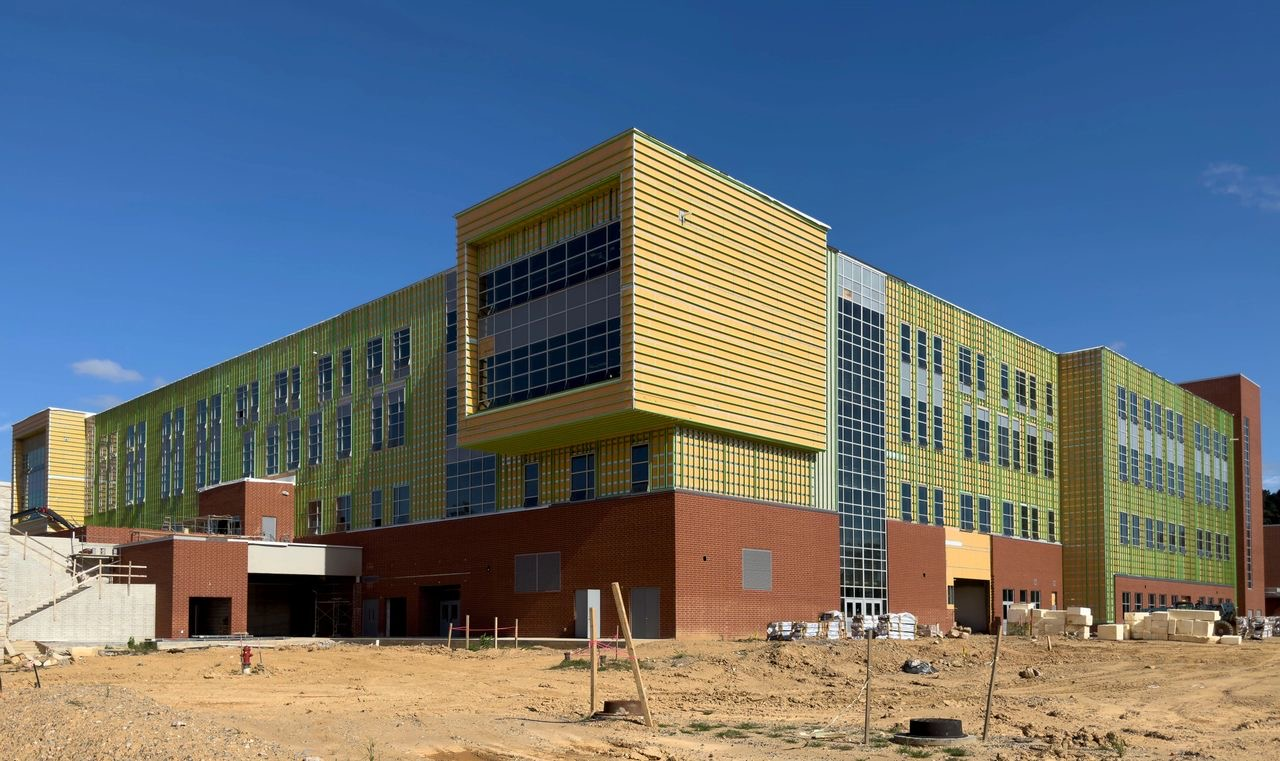
Charles Woodward High School during construction in September 2023

The school is expected to open as its own high school in Fall of 2027 for the 2027–28 school year. It was originally going to be 2025–26 school year, but was pushed back to 2026–27 school year then it was pushed back again to 2027–28 school year and it might be pushed back even further.

Demolition of Charles Woodward High School started in the summer of 2020. Phase one construction of the new school was completed in summer 2024 just in time for Northwood students to move in. Phase 2 construction which has the auditorium, parking garage, sports fields, etc. is expected to be completed in summer of 2026, but might be pushed back even further.

In 2018, then-County Council President Hans Riemer and then-Montgomery County first lady Catherine Leggett led an effort to rename Charles W. Woodward High School after Rev. Josiah Henson, who inspired the anti-slavery novel Uncle Tom's Cabin, when the school reopens in 2027 [11]. About 0.33 miles (0.53 km) north from the Woodward site is a county park and museum named for Henson.

=== Holding school For Northwood High School ===
Northwood Students were moved into Woodward in fall of 2024 with an incomplete building. There were incomplete classrooms, no auditorium, no sports fields, no black box theater, and more. These are expected to be finished in 2026 but might be delayed again. Northwood students are expected to remain at Woodward for 3 years but they might be there longer due to issues with Northwood's construction. Woodward is expected to open as its own high school in 2027–28 school year but might be delayed due to delayed construction with Northwood High School.

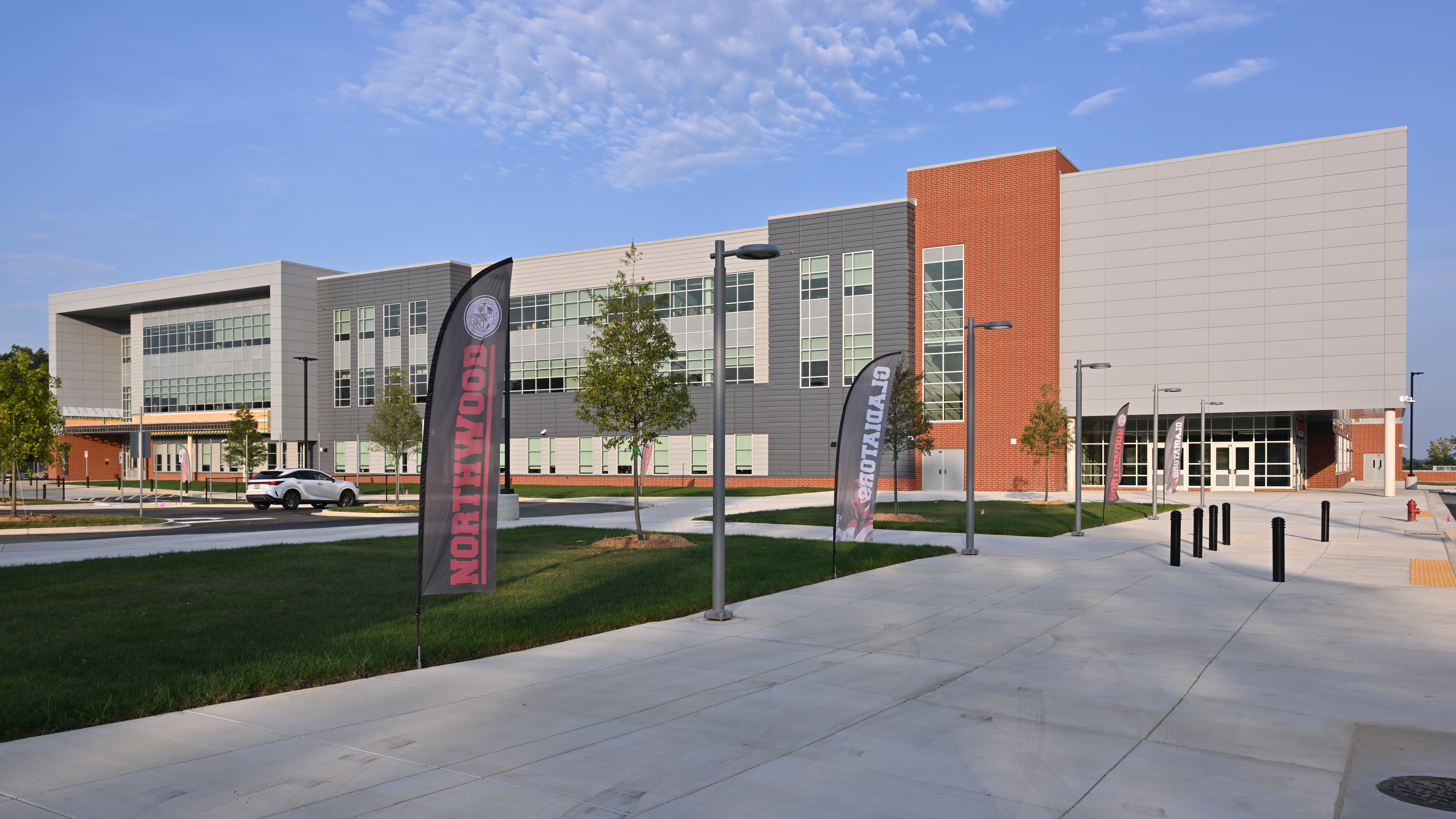
Northwood High School at Woodward in fall of 2024

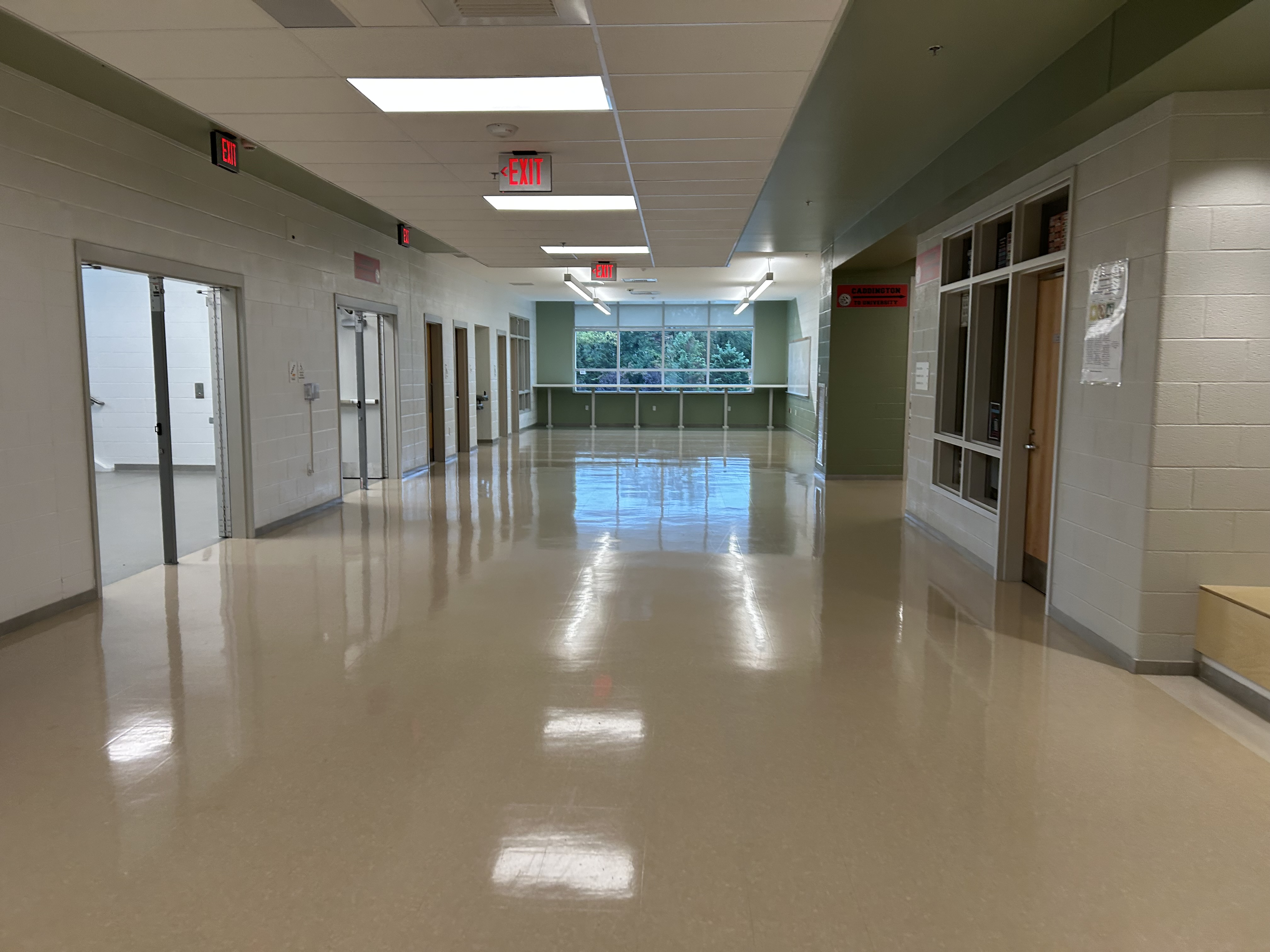
One of the hallways at Charles Woodward High School in fall of 2024

=== Reopening ===
With overcrowding at many schools in the downcounty area of Montgomery County, especially Walter Johnson, Woodward will be fully reopening with the goal of alleviating overcrowding at nearby schools. To address these concerns, MCPS has begun a boundary study that will affect up to eight high school service areas: Bethesda-Chevy Chase, Walter Johnson, Walt Whitman, and the five high schools within the Downcounty Consortium. The boundary changes are expected to take place at the start of the 2027–28 school year, when Northwood returns to their expanded facility in Silver Spring.

== Notable alumni ==
- Scott Cook, former professional soccer player
- Michael Davis, producer, director, and writer
- Michael Mayer, director
- Lisa Nowak, astronaut
- Steve Sands, Golf Channel broadcaster
- Daniel Snyder, former owner, Washington Commanders
- Brian Transeau, electronic musician
