= Layhill, Maryland =

- Census-designated place
- Location within Maryland
- Coordinates: 39°05′14″N 77°02′25″W
- Country: United States
- State: Maryland
- County: Montgomery

Area
  - Total: 1.60 sq mi (4.14 km^{2})
  - Land: 1.59 sq mi (4.11 km^{2})
  - Water: 0.0077 sq mi (0.02 km^{2})
- Elevation: 384 ft (117 m)

Population (2020)
  - Total: 5,764
  - Density: 3,628.0/sq mi (1,400.79/km^{2})
- ZIP Code: 20906 (Silver Spring)
- Area code: 301
- FIPS code: 24-46150
- GNIS feature ID: 2583648

Layhill is an unincorporated community and census-designated place in Montgomery County, Maryland, United States. According to the United States Census Bureau, Layhill had a population of 5,764 in 2020.

== History ==
=== Early history ===
A land patent for Lay Hill was issued on August 17, 1716. The size was recorded as 1,298 acres (2.0 sq mi; 5.3 km^{2}). The Northwest Branch ran through the tract, and the Norwood Turnpike passed its entire length. As of 1879, several farms, including those of Abraham Van Horn and A.J. Cashell, were located there.

=== Oak Chapel ===
The Victorian-style church now called Oak Chapel was originally built in 1887. It was formed when a nearby church divided on the issue of slavery, and the pro-slavery members formed this congregation. The fieldstone for the foundation was gathered by ox cart from neighboring land, while the timber was donated by George Bonifant Sr. from his nearby farm. A local saw mill made the boards. The chapel's cornerstone was laid on April 10, 1887. Lay Hill Methodist Episcopal Church, South was formally incorporated on October 26, 1886, and its first Board of Trustees consisted of George Bonifant, Andrew Johnson Cashell, John George Yewel Cashell, James William Godfrey, and Bennett Rufus Wilkerson. It was a congregation of the Methodist Episcopal Church, South, which had been formed in 1845 after the Methodist Episcopal Church had banned the ownership of enslaved people.

Since its founding, Lay Hill shared its pastor with eleven other Methodist Episcopal churches in the area, and the pastor rode a horse between each of the churches. In 1904, the Colesville Charge was formed, with Lay Hill, Four Corners, and Colesville sharing one minister between them. In 1947, Lay Hill was appointed its own student minister.

The adjacent church cemetery was dedicated by the Mullican family for use by the poor. The oldest headstone in the adjacent church cemetery is dated 1873.

The church shortened its name to Lay Hill Methodist Church in 1939. It became Lay Hill United Methodist Church in 1965 at the time of the unification of the Methodist and Evangelical United Brethren Churches. In 1968, the church filed articles of amendment to change its name to Oak Chapel Methodist Church, which it did in order to differentiate itself from the nearby Lay Hill Free Methodist Church on Bonifant Road, which had been founded in 1915. Two additions were made to the church, one in 1940 and one in 1970, both built lower on the hill so not to change the appearance of the church from the road.

Just to the north of the church was Lay Hill Academy, a one-room public schoolhouse that opened after an 1839 state law established guidance for education for the first time in Maryland. In 1890, the schoolhouse was demolished and replaced by a larger school building. The school closed in 1926 when Glenmont School opened. The church bought the old Lay Hill Academy schoolhouse in 1945, and it used it as a kitchen until 1957, when it was demolished.

=== Illegal brewery ===
On May 23, 1932, after weeks of investigation, Montgomery County police raided a house in Layhill and found a 20-horsepower steam boiler still and two barrels of mash. The police officers arrested Alfred Crum of Kensington, charging him with possession of paraphernalia for manufacturing of intoxicants. Crum was sentenced to four months imprisonment.

=== Proposed cemetery ===
In 1952, H. Glenn Garvin planned to establish a cemetery on Bel Pre Road between Georgia Avenue and Layhill Road. The Montgomery County Council denied the permit.

=== Rodeo ===
A group of business people from Wheaton sponsored daily rodeos and stampedes off Layhill Road between July 2 and July 5, 1954. It was called the Flying E Ranch Rodeo, and 130 cowboys and 200 head of cattle performed for spectators. Members of local churches complained to police about the beer drinking. Radie Evans, who operated the rodeo, had claimed to own the land for the rodeo when he applied for beer licenses. The land turned out to be owned by Helen McGarvey Saul instead, and Evans was arrested and charged with perjury.

=== Argyle Country Club ===
Argyle Country Club was originally located on Georgia Avenue in Petworth in the District of Columbia beginning in 1921. After selling its land to a developer, the club moved to Four Corners, Maryland, on September 30, 1923. The club operated in Four Corners until selling its land to be used for housing in 1945. Argyle Country Club reopened at its present Layhill location on June 28, 1947.

=== Residential development ===
The Layhill South neighborhood was developed in 1963. Layhill Village and Layhill Forest were built in 1965. The Strathmore at Bel Pre neighborhood was built in 1968. Chaddsford was developed in 1969. Argyle Village subdivision was developed in 1985 adjacent to Argyle Country Club. Parker Farm was developed in 1994.

=== Plaza del Mercado ===
Plaza del Mercado, a shopping center built by Ziegler Corporation, opened in October 1969. Original stores included Giant Food, Peoples Drug, McDonald's, and Hallmark Card Shop. Federal Realty Investment Trust bought Plaza del Mercado in October 2003. An Aldi grocery store opened there on December 1, 2016.

=== Widening of Layhill Road ===
In 1988, the Maryland State Highway Administration decided to widen Layhill Road. Residents were opposed when they learned that the widening would require destroying a 225-year-old 68-foot-tall oak tree that was a neighborhood landmark at the northwest corner of Layhill Road and Bel Pre Road. Forestry experts said the oak would not survive being moved across the street, and the State Highway Administration estimated that routing Layhill Road around the tree would cost $150,000. The plan continued, and the tree was cut down in October 1988.

== Geography ==
Layhill is in eastern Montgomery County, bordered by Cloverly to the northeast, Aspen Hill to the northwest, Glenmont to the south, and Colesville to the southeast. The center of the community is the intersection of Maryland Route 182 (Layhill Road) and Bonifant Road/Bel Pre Road. MD 182 leads south 3 miles (5 km) to Wheaton and north 5 miles (8 km) to Olney. Rockville, the Montgomery county seat, is 6 miles (10 km) to the west, and downtown Washington, D.C., is 13 miles (21 km) to the south.

According to the U.S. Census Bureau, the Layhill CDP has a total area of 1.6 square miles (4.1 km^{2}), of which 0.01 square miles (0.03 km^{2}), or 0.56%, are water.

== Education ==
Bel Pre Elementary School, Strathmore Elementary School, and Glenallen Elementary School serve Layhill's elementary school-aged children.

Argyle Middle School is located in Layhill; some of Layhill's students are zoned to Colonel E. Brooke Lee Middle School.

High school-aged students living in Layhill are generally zoned to John F. Kennedy High School.

Alternatively, through the Downcounty Consortium, students who live in Layhill may apply to attend Montgomery Blair High School, Albert Einstein High School, John F. Kennedy High School, Northwood High School, or Wheaton High School.

Barrie School, a private school, has been located in Layhill since September 8, 1958.

== Transportation ==
The Intercounty Connector (Maryland Route 200) crosses the northern part of Layhill, with access from Exit 10 (MD 182).

The Glenmont Metro station is 2 miles (3 km) south of Layhill. This underground station, which opened on July 25, 1998, is at the east end of the Red Line, and it has two large parking garages. From Glenmont, the Red Line heads south to downtown Silver Spring and to the District of Columbia before reentering Montgomery County and ending at Shady Grove.

== Demographics ==
Historical population
Census	Pop.	Note	%±
2010	5,169		—
2020	5,764		11.5%
U.S. Decennial Census; 2010

Layhill appeared as a census designated place in the 2010 U.S. census formed from part of the deleted Wheaton-Glenmont CDP and parts of the Aspen Hill CDP and Colesville CDP.

=== 2020 census ===
As of the 2020 census, Layhill had a population of 5,764. The median age was 42.8 years. 20.5% of residents were under the age of 18 and 18.4% of residents were 65 years of age or older. For every 100 females there were 98.1 males, and for every 100 females age 18 and over there were 93.4 males age 18 and over.

100.0% of residents lived in urban areas, while 0.0% lived in rural areas.

There were 1,835 households in Layhill, of which 37.4% had children under the age of 18 living in them. Of all households, 57.3% were married-couple households, 11.6% were households with a male householder and no spouse or partner present, and 27.5% were households with a female householder and no spouse or partner present. About 18.7% of all households were made up of individuals and 9.1% had someone living alone who was 65 years of age or older.

There were 1,864 housing units, of which 1.6% were vacant. The homeowner vacancy rate was 0.4% and the rental vacancy rate was 1.2%.

Racial composition as of the 2020 census
Race	Number	Percent
White	1,430	24.8%
Black or African American	2,021	35.1%
American Indian and Alaska Native	30	0.5%
Asian	851	14.8%
Native Hawaiian and Other Pacific Islander	4	0.1%
Some other race	722	12.5%
Two or more races	706	12.2%
Hispanic or Latino (of any race)	1,324	23.0%

=== 2010 census ===
As of the 2010 census, there were 5,169 people and 1,659 households residing in the Layhill CDP. There were 1,775 housing units. The racial makeup of the community was 38.2% White, 34.9% African American, 0.2% Native American, 15.5% Asian, 0.0% Pacific Islander, and 3.6% from two or more races. Hispanic or Latino people of any race consist of 17.6% of the population.

=== Households and housing ===
The average household size was 3.28, and the average family size was 3.56. In 2008–2012 American Community Survey estimates, 16.3% of households were non-families.

=== Education and veteran status ===
Of adults age 25 or older, 86% had a high school degree, 53% had a bachelor's degree, and 28% had a graduate degree. Civilian veterans were 8% of the population.

=== Demographic estimates ===
22% of residents were born in Maryland, 40% were born elsewhere in the United States, and 38% were born abroad. Of foreign-born residents, 58% were naturalized citizens of the United States. Of foreign-born residents, 37% were born in Latin American, 36% were born in Asia, 24% were born in Africa, and 3% were born in Europe.

Residents' ancestry includes Subsaharan African (10%), Irish (8%), English (7%), German (6%), American (4%), West Indian (3%), Polish (2%), Arab (2%), Swiss (2%), and Italian (1%).

=== Employment and commuting ===
Residents' method of commuting to work included driving alone (64%), carpooling (11%), and public transportation (20%); 4% worked from home. Residents' mean travel time to work is 38 minutes.

=== Income and poverty ===
The median income for a household in the census area was $120,184, and the median income for a family was $123,832. 6.2% of the population and 5.0% of families were below the poverty line. 8.4% of those under the age of 18 and 1.3% of those 65 and older were living below the poverty line.

== Points of interest ==
The Matthew Henson Trail starts at Layhill and continues for 4.2 miles (6.8 km) to Rock Creek in Rockville.

The National Capital Trolley Museum, which opened in 1969, is nearby.

Wat Thai Temple, a Buddhist temple, has been located in Layhill since 1995.
