= Oak Lea =

- Location within Maryland Location within the United States
- Alternative names: Cashell House

General information
- Location: Layhill, Maryland, United States
- Coordinates: 39.0959°N 77.0503°W
- Construction started: Prior to 1860

Oak Lea is a private home of 19th-century origin in the Layhill community of Montgomery County, Maryland, described as "the gracious culmination of architectural and building efforts dating back well over a hundred years."

The house is composed of three adjoined blocks built at different times:

- The north block is a one-and-one-half story clapboarded log structure, which appears to be the oldest part of the house. It has a three-bay façade, obscured by an enclosed lean-to porch, with three-over-six double-hung sash windows and a boxed cornice. A chimney at the south end of the block was enclosed by construction of the central block.
- The central block is two stories, with a three-bay façade, and six-over-six double-hung sash windows.
- The south block, also of two stories, has a five-bay galleried porch, with the fifth bay enclosed as the main doorway, contiguous with the galleried porch, and a two-story chimney of modern construction at its south end.

A log smokehouse and a frame bank-barn with a stone foundation were originally located to the west of the house, dating from the property's original agricultural use.

Additions of three log rooms were the only major changes made in the structure until the house was renovated in 1940.

In 1945, the farm's 20th century outbuildings and its pasture land were developed as a country club and golf course, Argyle Country Club, the barn becoming the club house with the hayloft repurposed for locker rooms, the milking shed as office space, and the stanchion area as the main lounge. In 1985, the remainder of the Oak Lea property was developed as Argyle Village, a 90 home subdivision adjacent to Argyle Country Club, with Oak Lea as the centerpiece.

In the early mid-20th century, Oak Lea was the home of noted Maryland golfer Roland MacKenzie.

Oak Lea was nominated for the National Register of Historic Places in 1974.
