= Disappearance of Hannah Upp =

Missing person case

Hannah Upp
- Born: November 29, 1984
- Disappeared: September 14, 2017; St. Thomas, U.S. Virgin Islands
- Status: Missing for 9 years, 1 month and 30 days

The disappearance of Hannah Upp is an unsolved missing person case of American woman Hannah Upp.

Upp was born in 1984, and is commonly referred to as "the woman who went missing three times" by the media. Upp first disappeared in August 2008 in New York and was found in September 2008 in a river, again in September 2013 in Maryland, and went missing a third and final time in 2017 in Saint Thomas, U.S. Virgin Islands. There has been no definitive sighting of Upp since 2017, and her fate or whereabouts are unknown.

Upp suffers from dissociative fugue, a rare psychiatric condition characterized by reversible amnesia regarding one's identity, often accompanied by unexpected travel or wandering. In some cases, individuals may assume a new identity and be unable to recall personal information from before the onset of symptoms.

== Early life ==
Hannah Emily Upp was born in 1984 and grew up in Oregon. Her parents were both pastors who served Japanese-American churches. Her mother, Barbara, had spent time teaching in Japan and spoke Japanese fluently. Hannah participated in Japanese cultural and church traditions while growing up.

Her parents divorced when Hannah was about 15. Her father subsequently traveled extensively as an evangelical missionary and teacher, while her mother remained in the United States. Hannah attended Bryn Mawr College, graduating in 2007 with a degree in Spanish and Comparative Literature. She then moved to New York City, where she became a New York City Teaching Fellow and pursued a master's degree at Pace University while working as a teacher.

== Disappearances ==
=== First disappearance in 2008 ===
The first disappearance occurred on August 28, 2008. Then-23-year-old Hannah Upp was last seen leaving her apartment to go for a jog. She had recently begun a new job as a teacher at Thurgood Marshall Academy in Harlem. Upp missed her first day of work and was later reported missing. Upp's keys, wallet, ID and other belongings were left behind. For 19–20 days she was missing. During that time, she was spotted in several places, such as an Apple Store in Midtown Manhattan, where she logged into her email, and at gyms, but she didn't seem to recognize who she was or why people were searching for her.

On September 16, 2008, the crew of a Staten Island Ferry discovered Upp lying facedown in the water. She was rescued alive and was taken to the hospital where she was treated for dehydration and hypothermia.

After her discovery, Upp was diagnosed with dissociative fugue, a rare form of amnesia where a person temporarily loses their knowledge of their identity, and may travel or act without memory of who they are.

=== Second disappearance in 2013 ===
In 2013, then-28-year-old Hannah Upp was working as an assistant teacher at a Montessori school in Maryland. On September 3, 2013, Upp was reported missing from her job. Her wallet and phone had been found on a footpath.

On September 5, 2013, Upp was found in the Wheaton-Glenmont, Maryland area after borrowing a stranger's phone and calling her mother. Upp told police she did not remember where she was or how she had gotten there.

=== Third and final disappearance in 2017 ===
In 2017, Hannah Upp relocated to the U.S. Virgin Island of Saint Thomas, taking a new teaching position. In September 2017, Saint Thomas was struck by Hurricane Irma and was preparing for Hurricane Maria.

On September 14, 2017, Upp was last seen leaving her home around 8 a.m., reportedly planning to go swimming at Sapphire Beach. Upp missed a scheduled school meeting and was reported missing. Her car was found parked near the beach, with her belongings untouched, including her wallet, phone, passport and other personal items.

Initial searches were hampered by the approaching hurricane conditions. Extended search efforts by local authorities, family and friends took place in the following weeks. As of 2026, Hannah Upp is still missing.
