= Barrie School =

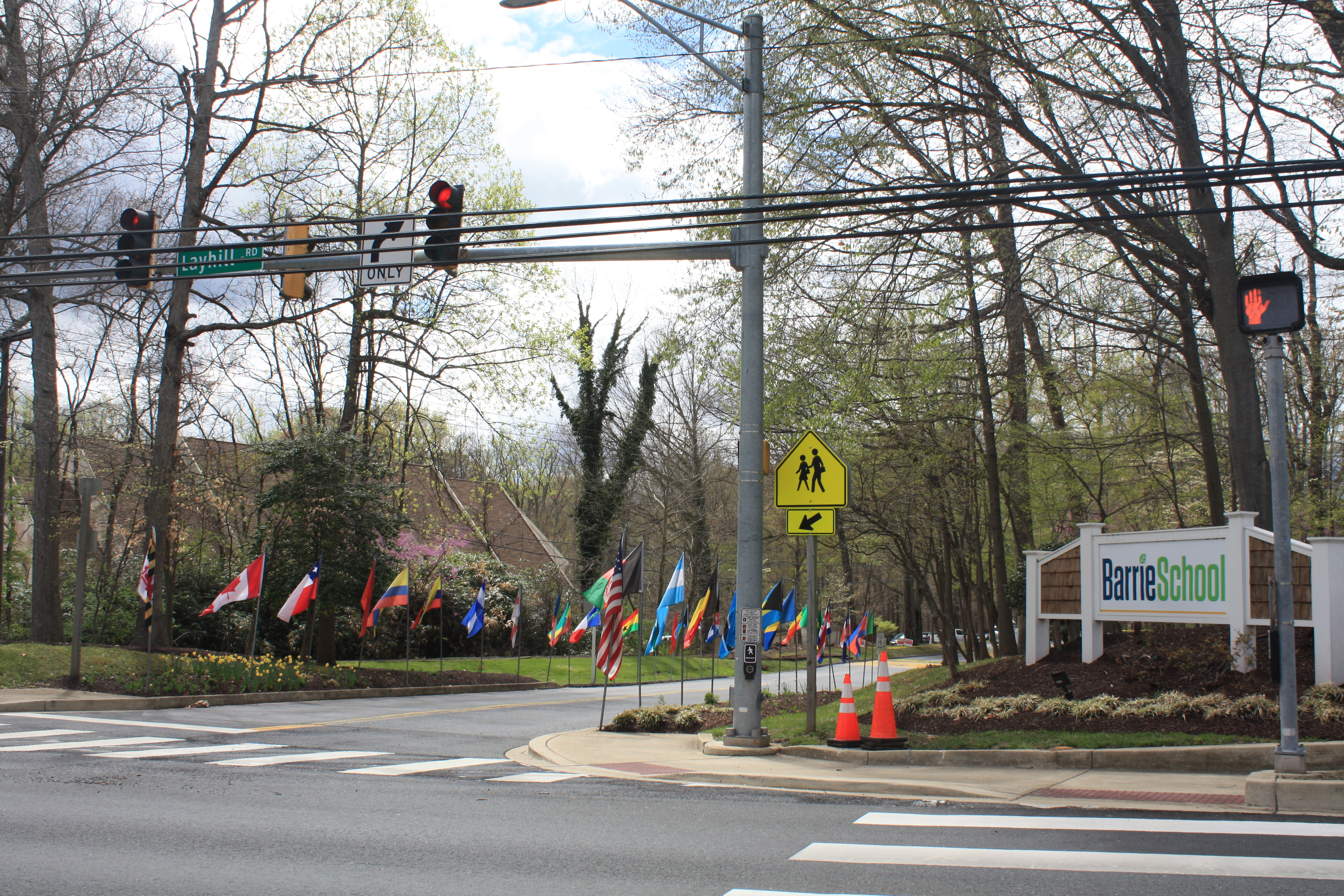
- Entrance to the Barrie School (April 2025)

Location
- 13500 Layhill Road; Silver Spring, Maryland 20906; United States; 39.0778674°N 77.0490025°W

Information
- Funding type: Private
- Established: 1932
- Founder: Frances Littman Seldin
- CEEB code: 210951
- Head of school: Ben Thrash
- Faculty: 59 FTE
- Grades: 3 months through Grade 12
- Enrollment: 333
- Student to teacher ratio: 6.1
- Hours in school day: 7.5
- Campus size: 45 acres (180,000 m^{2})
- Campus type: Suburban
- Colors: Blue and gold
- Team name: Mustangs
- Website: www.barrie.org

Barrie School is a progressive independent school for students age 3 months through Grade 12 located in an unincorporated area of Montgomery County, Maryland, outside Washington, D.C. The school is within the Glenmont census designated place, has a Silver Spring postal address, and is in close proximity to Layhill. Barrie School is a nonprofit school with 501(c)(3) status.

Barrie School has three divisions located on the same campus. The Lower School, which serves children from age 3 months through fifth grade, is Montessori-based. Barrie School protects students from in-class screen use until 4th grade. This contrasts with the local Montgomery County Public Schools, which introduce personal screens in kindergarten. Barrie School's Middle and Upper School uses a project-based and experiential learning curriculum. The campus has several buildings, a pool, and two ponds. Barrie School's equestrian program closed in 2020 due to the COVID-19 pandemic, and the horses and ponies were re-homed.

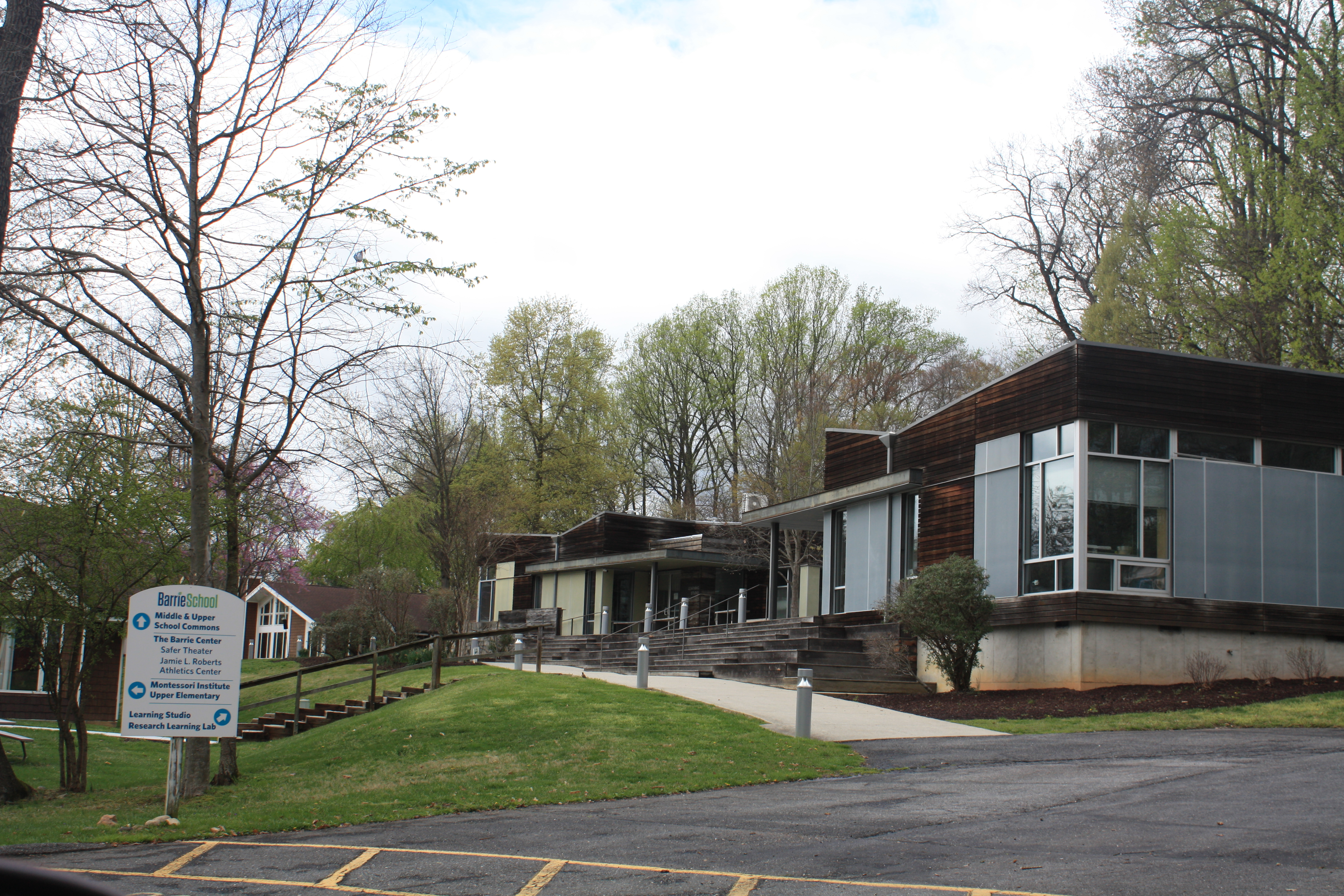
Barrie School Learning Studio and Research Learning Lab building (April 2025)

== History ==
=== Founding in Mount Pleasant ===
The school was founded in 1932 by Frances Littman Seldin as a preschool called the Peter Pan School, located at 1604 Park Road NW in the Mount Pleasant neighborhood of the District of Columbia. A native of New York, Seldin was a graduate of Columbia University and a member of the Naturalist Hiking Club.

=== Move to Takoma ===
The school moved to 801 Fern Street NW in the Takoma neighborhood in 1939. A zoning variance to establish a school in the residential neighborhood, which was opposed by the Takoma Park Citizens Association, was granted by the District of Columbia Board of Zoning Adjustment. The new location was a 17-acre (69,000 m^{2}) urban campus. The name was changed to Barrie School when upper grade classes were added, memorializing author J. M. Barrie, creator of the Peter Pan story.

Barrie was described by Mrs. Seldin as a progressive country day school, directly influenced by the work of John Dewey, Maria Montessori, Alfred Adler, and Anna Freud. It was an anomaly among private schools in Washington, D.C., for much of its history because of Mrs. Seldin's then-controversial beliefs about integration, creating a socioeconomically diverse population, and her decision to offer a year-round program and extended hours to serve working parents. Although the name Montessori was rarely used in describing Barrie School during those years, the program was heavily influenced by Maria Montessori's philosophy and program, including practical life, integrated learning and project-based collaborative learning, multiple age class groups, and a culture of partnership between students, parents, and staff.

=== Move to Montgomery County ===
In the 1950s, Mrs. Seldin purchased a 45-acre (180,000 m^{2}) country estate on Layhill Road in rural Montgomery County, Maryland. The school began operating there in 1958. The new site was added to continue the school's mission of teaching in a natural setting. Barrie Camp moved to the property. In 1976, the Fern Place campus was closed and the remaining Middle and Lower School classes were moved to the Layhill Road property, with room for 265 students.

The Upper School (Grades 9–12) was closed from 1974 through 1982 as a result of Ms. Seldin's death and the need to sell the Fern Place campus to cover estate taxes, and a building moratorium imposed on new construction in Montgomery County during that period that created a cap on enrollment at the Layhill Road campus.

The high school was reopened in 1982 in time for the 50th anniversary of Barrie School's founding, which was celebrated with the reopening of the Upper School in the former Argyle Junior High School building on Bel Pre Road. That year, Barrie's Upper School was formally recognized by the American Montessori Society as the first Montessori High School in the United States. In that year the Barrie Institute for Advanced Montessori Studies was authorized by the American Montessori Society and Maryland State Commission of Higher Education to offer the first formal teacher preparation for secondary Montessori educators (ages 12–18).

Classes were held until new buildings on the Layhill Road campus were completed in the summer of 1991, bringing the Primary, Lower and Upper Elementary, Middle, and Upper School students together on one campus again.

=== Barrie Institute for Advanced Montessori Studies ===
In 1980, the Barrie Institute for Advanced Montessori Studies, offering graduate-level teacher education programs, was founded on Barrie School's Layhill Road campus to provide bridge between the traditional and Montessori schools of education. The training programs have been completed by individuals from the United States, Canada, Trinidad, China, and South Korea.

== Notable alumni ==
William C. Smith: Maryland Senate Officer
