= Dissociative fugue =

Dissociative disorder

- Other names: Fugue state, psychogenic fugue
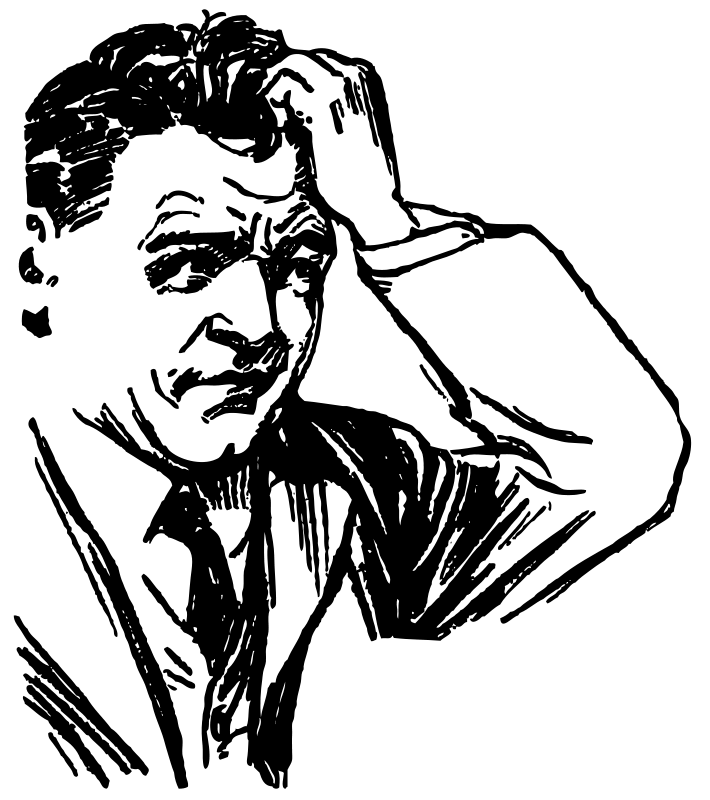
- Specialty: Psychiatry, neurology

Dissociative fugue (/fjuːɡ/ FYOOG), previously referred to as a fugue state or psychogenic fugue, is a rare psychiatric condition characterized by reversible amnesia regarding one's identity, often accompanied by unexpected travel or wandering. In some cases, individuals may assume a new identity and be unable to recall personal information from before the onset of symptoms. It is classified as a mental and behavioral disorder and is variously categorized as a dissociative disorder, a conversion disorder, or a somatic symptom disorder. According to the Diagnostic and Statistical Manual of Mental Disorders (DSM-5), dissociative fugue is a subset of dissociative amnesia.

Recovery from a fugue state typically results in the restoration of prior memories, and additional treatment is generally unnecessary. Episodes are not considered dissociative fugue if attributable to psychotropic substances, physical trauma, general medical conditions, or disorders such as dissociative identity disorder, delirium, or dementia. Dissociative fugue is often triggered by prolonged traumatic experiences and is most frequently associated with individuals who experienced childhood sexual abuse, during which they developed dissociative amnesia to suppress memories of the abuse.

== Signs and symptoms ==
Symptoms of dissociative fugue include mild confusion during the episode and, following recovery, possible feelings of depression, grief, shame, discomfort, or post-fugue anger. A key feature of the condition is the loss of one's identity.

== Diagnosis ==
Before dissociative fugue can be diagnosed, either dissociative amnesia or dissociative identity disorder must be diagnosed. The only difference between dissociative amnesia, dissociative identity disorder and dissociative fugue is that the person affected by the latter travels or wanders. This traveling or wandering is typically associated with the amnesia-induced identity or the person's physical surroundings.

Sometimes dissociative fugue cannot be diagnosed until the patient returns to their pre-fugue identity and is distressed to find themselves in unfamiliar circumstances, sometimes with awareness of "lost time". The diagnosis is usually made retroactively when a doctor reviews the history and collects information that documents the circumstances before the patient left home, the travel itself, and the establishment of an alternative life.

Functional amnesia can also be situation-specific, varying from all forms and variations of trauma or generally violent experiences, with the person experiencing severe memory loss for a particular trauma. Committing homicide, experiencing or committing a violent crime such as rape or torture, experiencing combat violence, attempting suicide, and being in automobile accidents and natural disasters have all induced cases of situation-specific amnesia. In these unusual cases, care must be exercised in interpreting cases of dissociative amnesia when there are compelling motives to feign memory deficits for legal or financial reasons. However, although some fraction of dissociative amnesia cases can be explained in this fashion, it is generally acknowledged that true cases are not uncommon. Both global and situationally specific amnesia are often distinguished from the organic amnesic syndrome, in that the capacity to store new memories and experiences remains intact. Given the very delicate and oftentimes dramatic nature of memory loss in such cases, there usually is a concerted effort to help the person recover their identity and history. This will sometimes allow the subject to recover spontaneously, when particular cues are encountered.

=== Definition ===
The cause of the fugue state is related to dissociative amnesia (code 300.12 of the DSM-IV codes), which has several other subtypes: selective amnesia, generalized amnesia, continuous amnesia, and systematized amnesia, in addition to the subtype "dissociative fugue".

Unlike retrograde amnesia (which is popularly referred to simply as "amnesia", the state where someone forgets events before brain damage), dissociative amnesia is not due to the direct physiological effects of a substance (e.g., a drug of abuse, a medication, DSM-IV codes 291.1 & 292.83) or a neurological or other general medical condition (e.g., amnestic disorder due to a head trauma, DSM-IV Code 294.0). It is a complex neuropsychological process.

As the person experiencing a dissociative fugue may have recently experienced the reappearance of an event or person representing an earlier trauma, the emergence of an armoring or defensive personality seems to be for some, a logical defense strategy in the situation.

Therefore, the terminology "fugue state" may carry a slight linguistic distinction from "dissociative fugue", the former implying a greater degree of "motion". For the purposes of this article, then, a "fugue state" occurs while one is "acting out" a "dissociative fugue".

The DSM-IV defines "dissociative fugue" as:

- Sudden, unexpected travel away from home or one's customary place of work, with inability to recall one's past
- Confusion about personal identity, or the assumption of a new identity
- Significant distress or impairment

The Merck Manual defines "dissociative fugue" as:

One or more episodes of amnesia in which the inability to recall some or all of one's past and either the loss of one's identity or the formation of a new identity occur with sudden, unexpected, purposeful travel away from home.

In support of this definition, the Merck Manual further defines dissociative amnesia as:

An inability to recall important personal information, usually of a traumatic or stressful nature, that is too extensive to be explained by normal forgetfulness.

== Prognosis ==
The DSM-IV-TR states that the fugue may have a duration from days to months, and recovery is usually rapid. However, some cases may be refractory and resist treatment. An individual usually has only one episode.

== Cases ==
- Shirley Ardell Mason (1923–1998), also known as "Sybil", would disappear and then reappear with no recollection of what happened during the time span. She recalled "being here and then not here" and having no identity of herself. It was claimed by her psychiatrist, Cornelia Wilbur, that she also had dissociative identity disorder. Wilbur's diagnosis of DID was disputed by Wilbur's contemporary Herbert Spiegel.
- Jody Roberts, a reporter for the Tacoma News Tribune, disappeared in 1985, only to be found 12 years later in Sitka, Alaska, living under the name of "Jane Dee Williams". While there were some initial suspicions that she had been faking amnesia, some experts have come to believe that she genuinely experienced a protracted fugue state.
- David Fitzpatrick, who had dissociative fugue disorder, was profiled in the UK on Five's television series Extraordinary People. He entered a fugue state on December 4, 2005, and was working on regaining his entire life's memories at the time of his appearance in his episode of the documentary series.
- Hannah Upp, a teacher originally from Salem, Oregon, was given a diagnosis of dissociative fugue after she had disappeared from her New York home in August 2008 and was rescued from New York Harbor 20 days later. News coverage at the time focused on her refusal to speak to detectives right after she was found and the fact that she was seen checking her email at Apple Stores while she was missing. This coverage has since led to criticism of the often "condemning and discrediting" attitude toward dissociative conditions. On September 3, 2013, she went into another fugue, disappearing from her new job as a teacher's assistant at Crossway Community Montessori in Kensington, Maryland. She was found unharmed two days later on September 5, 2013, in Wheaton, Maryland. On September 14, 2017, she went missing again, having last been seen near Sapphire Beach in her home in St. Thomas right before the arrival of Hurricane Maria that month. Her mother and a group of friends searched for her in the Virgin Islands and surrounding areas; as of 2026, she remains missing.
- Jeff Ingram appeared in Denver in 2006 with no memory of his name or where he was from. After his appearance on national television, to appeal for help identifying himself, his fiancée called Denver police identifying him. The episode was diagnosed as dissociative fugue. As of December 2012, Ingram had experienced three incidents of amnesia: in 1994, 2006, and 2007.
- Doug Bruce "came to" on a subway train claiming to have no memory of his name or where he was from, nor any identification documents.
- The Bruneri-Canella case involves the alleged reappearance of a man who had gone missing in World War I.
- Agatha Christie (possibly). Following a spate of traumatic and stressful events, Christie went missing in 1926, and was found at a spa hotel, having checked in under another name; when found, she claimed to be suffering from amnesia. Historian Lucy Worsley posited that Christie's behavior could be explained by Christie having experienced a fugue state.
- Lizzie Borden, who may have murdered her father and stepmother under fugue state.

== Fictional cases ==
- Paris, Texas, a film by Wim Wenders where the protagonist (Harry Dean Stanton) portrays and must cope with the disorder
- The Fisher King, a film by Terry Gilliam where the protagonist (Robin Williams) develops the disorder in response to losing his wife in a homicide he witnessed
- Lost Highway, a film by David Lynch that explores the disorder
- Nurse Betty, a film by Neil LaBute where the protagonist (Renée Zellweger) portrays the disorder in order to cope with losing her husband to a homicide she witnessed
- K-Pax, a film by Iain Softley where the protagonist (Kevin Spacey) is suspected of having some form of the disorder brought on from losing his family in a homicide
- "The Next Doctor", an episode of Doctor Who in which the Doctor (David Tennant) encounters Jackson Lake (David Morrissey), a character who portrays the disorder, believing himself to be the Doctor.
- Franklyn, a film written and directed by Gerald McMorrow where two of the supporting protagonists (Ryan Phillippe) and (Sam Riley) show traits of the disorder in order to cope with PTSD from Combat stress reaction and family Bereavement
- Man Down, a film by Dito Montiel where the protagonist (Shia LaBeouf) shows traits of the disorder in order to cope with PTSD from Combat stress reaction and Bereavement
- The Naked Sun novel by Isaac Asimov is about a murder committed under fugue state
- In the television series Breaking Bad, the protagonist Walter White fakes a fugue state in Season 2 episode 3 "Bit by a Dead Bee", as an alibi to his kidnapping by Tuco Salamanca.
- In Honkai Star Rail, the character Fugue is named after the disorder, and suffers from it because her previous identity as Tingyun was stolen.
- In the 1962 film The Cabinet of Caligari, the protagonist is revealed to have been in a fugue state.
- In the 2010 film Shutter Island, the protagonist seems to have been under something akin to a fugue state.
- The protagonist of the 2012 novel The Man Who Forgot His Wife by John O'Farrell emerges from a fugue state and falls in love with his own wife, from whom (as he discovers) he is separated and in the process of divorce.

== See also ==
- Depersonalization derealization disorder
- Dromomania, a similar historical diagnosis involving a strong desire to wander or travel
- Structured Clinical Interview for DSM-IV
