= Norwood, Maryland =

Unincorporated area in Montgomery County, Maryland, United States

Coordinates: 39°07′31″N 77°01′39″W

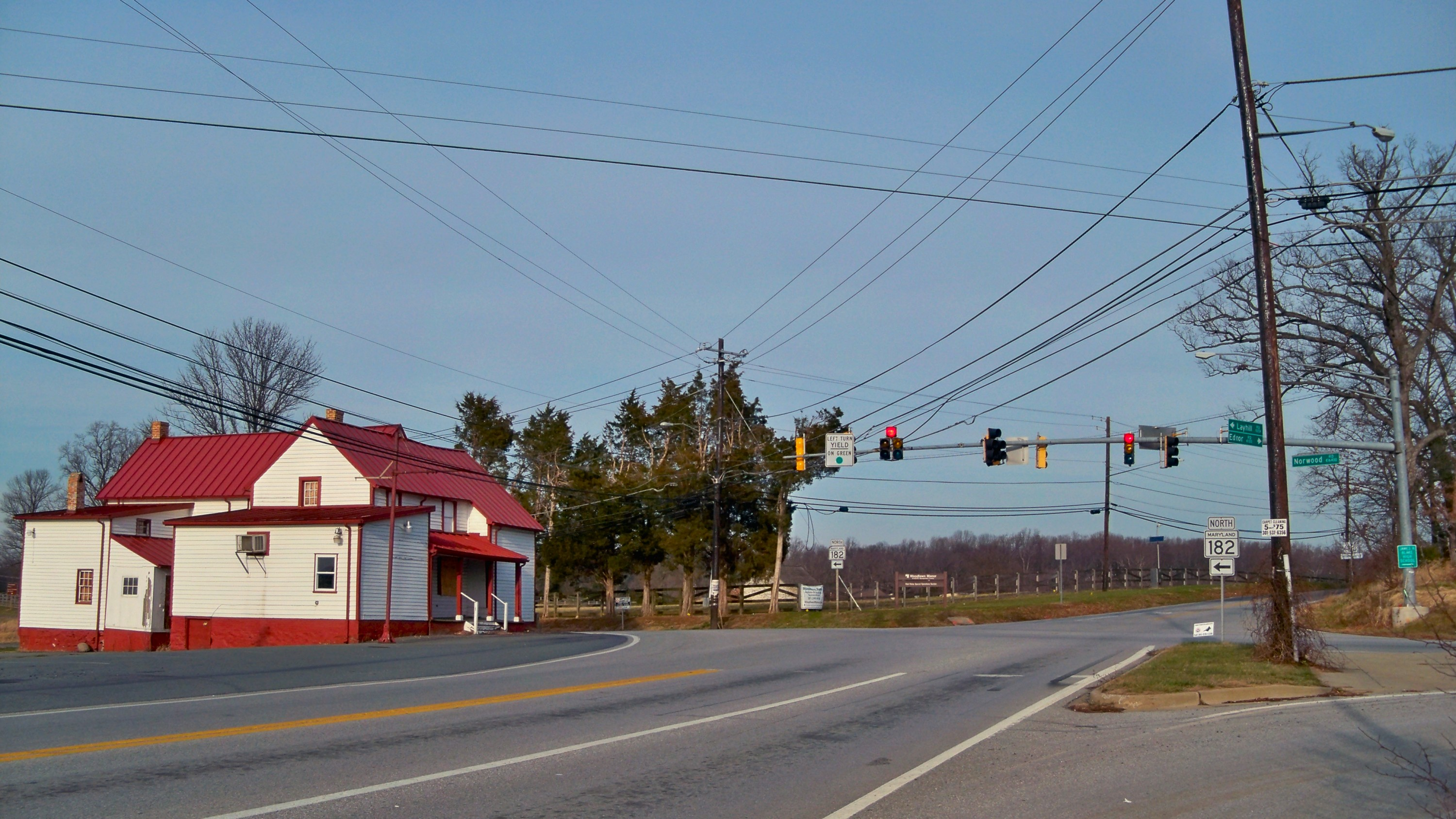
Downtown Norwood with Holland's Store on the left

Norwood is an unincorporated community in Montgomery County, Maryland, United States, located at the intersection of Layhill Road (MD 182), Norwood Road (also MD 182), and Ednor Road, two miles from the Intercounty Connector (ICC).

Norwood was named Holland's Corner at one time from a store built in 1860 by James Holland. In 1889, Holland became the first postmaster of the town, which was renamed Norwood around the same time. The Red Door Country Store, at the corner of Norwood Road and Ednor Road, was a general store owned by Marie E. Smith that had a scale on which farmers weighed their grain. The store also served as a post office after the closure of the post office in nearby Ednor, Maryland.

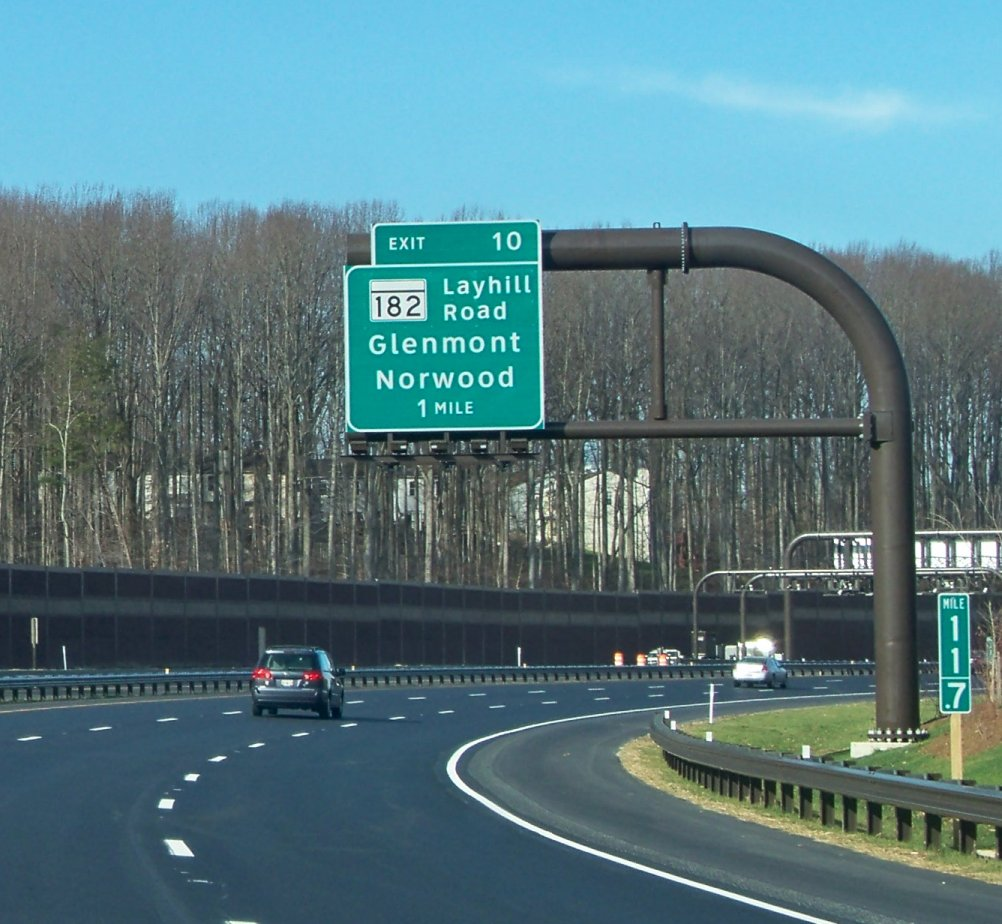
Norwood sign on the Intercounty Connector

Norwood as a toponym is largely unused and this lack of use gained local prominence due to the use of "Norwood" as one of two "key destinations" listed on signs for the Layhill Road interchange on the ICC (Exit 10).
