= Glenmont, Maryland =

- Census-designated place
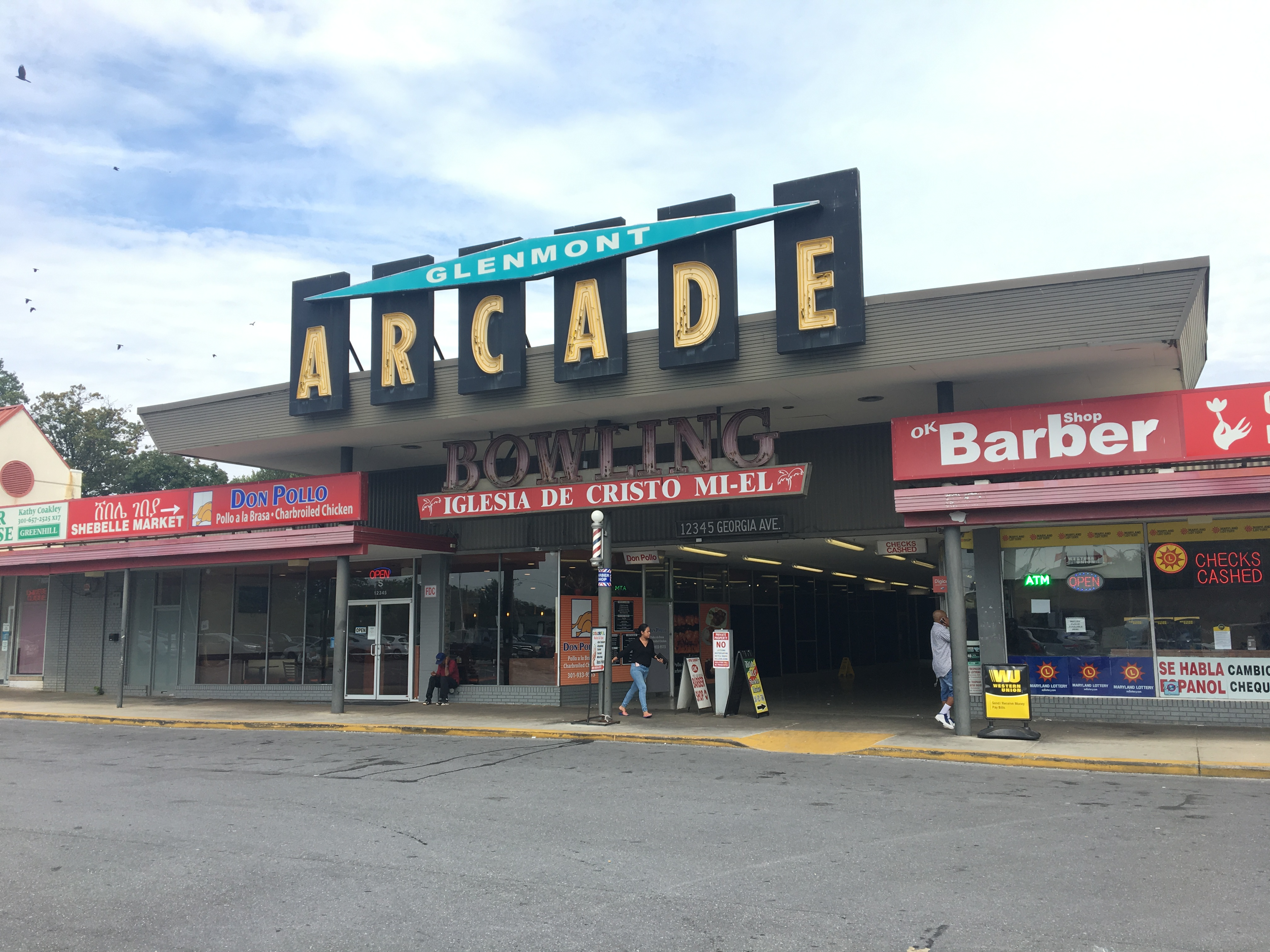
- The Glenmont Arcade in October 2018.

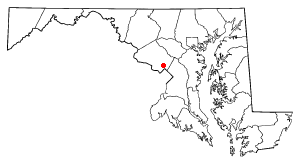
- Location of Glenmont in the State of Maryland
- Coordinates: 39°04′11″N 77°02′48″W
- Country: United States
- State: Maryland
- County: Montgomery

Area
  - Total: 2.82 sq mi (7.31 km^{2})
  - Land: 2.80 sq mi (7.25 km^{2})
  - Water: 0.023 sq mi (0.06 km^{2})
- Elevation: 390 ft (120 m)

Population (2020)
  - Total: 16,710
  - Density: 5,967.6/sq mi (2,304.09/km^{2})
- GNIS feature ID: 2583632

Glenmont is an unincorporated community and census-designated place in Montgomery County, Maryland, United States. The United States Census Bureau had combined Glenmont with nearby Wheaton to create the census-designated place of Wheaton-Glenmont, from 2000 to 2010. It had a population of 16,710 in 2020.

== Geography ==
Due to its unincorporated nature, the boundaries are difficult to precisely define, but the center of the community is located at the intersection of Randolph Road and Georgia Avenue (Maryland State Highway 97).

== History ==
=== Historic homes ===
==== The Hermitage ====
The Hermitage, around 1952.

A brick Colonial manor house, named the Hermitage, was built by John Bowie Jr., in 1750. Bowie's father, John Bowie Sr., was a Scottish immigrant who arrived in America around 1705. John Bowie Jr. purchased the land for 25 cents per acre, and on it he built the Hermitage for his sixteen-year-old son, Allen Bowie Jr. The property itself was located around where Georgian Forest Park is today. Two years later, John died, and Allen moved to the property. In June 1774, Allen was part of a now-famous meeting at Hungerford's Tavern in today's Rockville where those in attendance fiercely criticized Great Britain and decided they should stop trading with it. During the American Revolution, Allen Bowie commanded a company of troops, which he funded himself.

Allen's son, Washington Bowie, was born in the Hermitage on August 12, 1776. Washington Bowie, nicknamed the merchant prince, later built a mansion at 3124 Q Street NW in Georgetown, which is today called the Bowie-Sevier House. Allen's other son, John, inherited the Hermitage after his father died. John was a doctor, and he fought in the War of 1812.

John Bowie died in 1825, unmarried and without any heirs, and the Hermitage was held in a trust for several Bowie family members. A farmer named J.P. Dodge bought the Hermitage and approximately 160 acres of land in 1865. Dodge owned the house for 35 years until his death in 1900, when his daughters Jacie Dodge and Mrs. Elwood Matthews inherited the Hermitage.

Southwick Briggs, a floriculturist, bought the Hermitage and 125 acres of land from Matthews in 1914. Briggs spent a lot of money decorating and updating the Hermitage and planting flowers on its land. Briggs and his wife died after ten years of living in the Hermitage, and the property was bought by the Kauffman-Goldnamer Company of Washington. The Hermitage was still standing in 1952, a three-story brick house, painted yellow, with a large front porch and a rear flagstone terrace.

==== Hermitage II ====
Hermitage II, around 1952.

The Hermitage II was a historic house, built of hand-hewn lumber and handmade nails. It was built by William C. Peerce, sometime between 1816 and 1820. It was located around where Layhill Road meets Hathaway Drive today. Peerce owned 1,066 acres of land surrounding the house. He also owned about sixty enslaved people, who lived in several quarters around the property. Edward Palmer bought the Hermitage II and about 180 acres of land in 1905. Francis P. Welsh, a farmer, bought the house from Palmer in 1920. A Washington businessman named Max Walten bought the Hermitage II in 1928.

==== Champayne Farmhouse ====
The Champayne Farmhouse was built by John R. Champayne around 1860, at what is now 14201 Layhill Road. The house was built on a 114-acre plot of land that Champayne had bought from James Henry Boyd. Champayne put the title of the property in the name of his wife, Ell Champayne (née Beall), because he wanted it to be protected from being acquired by his own family. When talking to his father-in-law, Champayne once said that his own family "would take it as quick as hell would scorch a feather". At the time Champayne acquired the land, it had been completely covered by a pine forest. Champayne cleared the land, built a home, a blacksmith shop, a stable, a corn house, and a few other buildings on the land. Ell's family provided most of the wood for the outbuildings and the fencing. George Bonifant, a neighboring farmer, was impressed with all the improvements that Champayne had added to the land. Ell died in 1874, and title of the land was transferred to a trust. Ell is buried in the Beall Cemetery, located on Beechview Lane.

By 1880, a second story had been added to the house, it had apple and peach trees, and there was a dairy, a wheelwright shop, and a paint shop on the land. That year, the trustee sold the property to Sarah R. Nicholson for $1,827.20 (equivalent to $61,000 in 2025). The Nicholson family owned the property for many years to come.

By the 1990s, Champayne Farmhouse was being rented out, but the outbuildings were all in very bad condition and collapsing. In 2005, much of the land surrounding the Champayne Farmhouse was redeveloped and residential homes were built. The Champayne Farmhouse still stands as of 2026.

=== Naming of the area ===
In the nineteenth and early twentieth centuries, the area contained a few houses and small farms lining the Washington–Brookeville Turnpike, as Georgia Avenue was then called. The Hardy family farm was located between current-day Randolph Road and Parker Avenue and stayed in the family for generations. In 1898, Mary Hardy gave the name Glenmont to the area's post office at what is now Georgia Avenue and Randolph Road. Annie Lofler was appointed the new postmaster of Glenmont in 1900. Although the post office was closed in 1901, the name for the area stuck, albeit occasionally misspelled as Glenmount.

=== Glenmont School ===
Glenmont's first school opened in 1926. Built at a cost of $50,000, the Glenmont School had 136 students enrolled in its first school year. Miss Ruth Burroughs was the first principal. The Glenmont School was located at 12210 Georgia Avenue (then called Brookeville Turnpike), on the site of land to which the Glenmont Fire Station relocated to in 2016. The brick schoolhouse had four classrooms, two special department rooms, and an auditorium. It was built after the consolidation and closure of schools in Aspen Hill, Layhill, and Wheaton. The Glenmont School served students who lived in Glenmont, Aspen Hill, Layhill, and Wheaton. The Cissel-Saxon Post of the American Legion donated an American flag to the Glenmont School in 1928. Major E. Brooke Lee donated a memorial flag pole, which was dedicated in the memory of Paul Latene Hull, who was killed in action in France during World War I.

A school extension designed by V.T.H. Bien was built in 1946, adding office space and a large space used as a gymnasium and cafeteria.

Additional extensions were constructed in 1953, and 1956. Demolition of the original structure compromised the integrity of the overall structure. In 2002, the Maryland Historical Trust (MHT) decided that the school was not eligible for inclusion in the National Register of Historic Places, because according to the MHT's judgment, the school was not an important example of post-World War II suburban development, Glenmont was not a significant part of Montgomery County's suburbanization history at the time, and the design of the building was fairly typical for the time.

=== Residential development, 1940s–1960s ===
Glenmont remained largely undeveloped until after World War II, when suburbanization began with the construction of subdivisions in Glenmont. The State Roads Commission began plans to widen Georgia Avenue in 1948. Commercial and residential development began transforming the rural area known as Glenmont in 1949, with two major developments, Glenmont Village and Glenmont Forest.

In 1947, the Washington Suburban Sanitary Commission built the 189-foot (58 m) tall Glenmont Water Tower, a multi‐columned elevated water tank with a capacity of 500,000 U.S. gallons (1,900,000 L). The water allowed for residential growth in and around Glenmont.

Georgia Avenue Baptist Church was built in 1956, and an education wing was added in 1962.

The Americana Glenmont, a residential apartment complex, was built by developer Carl M. Freeman in 1961 and 1965. The complex was designed with modern architecture and a natural, park-like setting. It was later renamed Glenmont Forest.

=== Glenmont Shopping Center ===
Glenmont Shopping Center is located on the northeast corner of Randolph Road and Georgia Avenue.

In 1952, Edward C. Baltz, Thornton W. Owen, David S. Moore, and Edward L. Strohecker Sr., announced a plan to construct a shopping center and 1,000 homes on 250 acres at Georgia Avenue, Layhill Road, and Randolph Road. The Glenmont Land and Development Corporation began construction of the shopping center in 1956. The center was not constructed in one building campaign. It was expanded as the developers were able to bring in new businesses. In its original construction, each store had a large plate glass display windows held in by tubular aluminum, known as an "open design." One portion of the shopping area, known as the "Arcade", included a 24-lane bowling alley. The alley was named for Alphone "Tuffy" Leeman, who played for the New York Giants in the 1930s and 1940s. By 1957, the shopping center included the bowling alley, a dry cleaner, a hardware store, and a restaurant. A Grand Union supermarket opened in 1959. By 1962, the shopping center included a hairstylist, barber shop, shoe service, insurance agency, Glenmont Inn Restaurant, a Chinese restaurant, a hardware store, a saving and loan association, a High's Dairy Store, a glass and mirror store, a bicycle store, a People's Drug Store, and a post office.

The Glenmont Shopping Center fell into some disrepair in the early 1990s. Residents of the Glenmont area have repeatedly asked the county and store owners to make safety improvements to the parking lot and to upgrade the facades of the stores. One of the largest obstacles in widespread renovation to the Glenmont Shopping Center is that it is actually divided into 15 different parcels of land that are owned by 12 different property owners. With stable rents, low vacancy rates, and low cost of ownership, the property owners have little motivation for large, coordinated improvements of the shopping center.

== Transportation ==
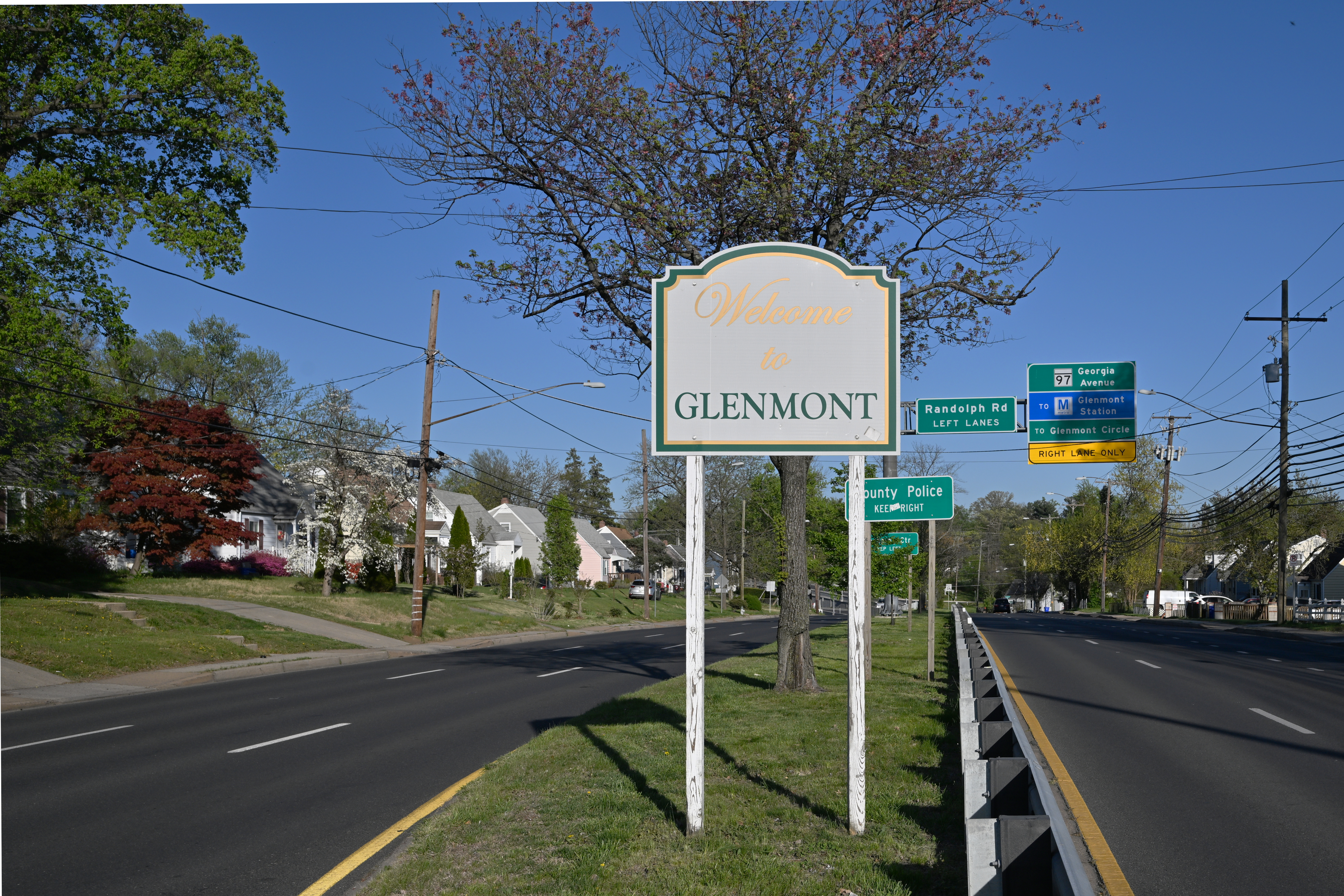
Eastbound Randolph Rd just before it passes under Georgia Ave

Glenmont is a suburban crossroads of three major roads, Georgia Avenue, Layhill Road, and Randolph Road.

The Glenmont Metro station serves the area. This underground station, which opened in 1998, is at the east end of the Red Line, and has two large parking garages. From Glenmont, the Red Line heads south through downtown Silver Spring and to the District of Columbia before re-entering Montgomery County at Bethesda, traveling through Rockville, and ending at Shady Grove.

== Government ==
The Kensington Volunteer Fire Department has a fire station at the intersection of Randolph Road and Georgia Avenue. The station was designed by architect Ted Englehardy as a large Colonial Revival wing-and-gable building. the exterior of the building is of brick construction and contains an exterior chimney and clock tower.

Montgomery County Police District 4 headquarters is also located at the intersection. The police station was designed by Bagley, Soule & Associates of Chevy Chase in 1958. The construction was completed in 1959. The building has several additions, which reflect a change from the original Colonial Revival design. The complex features traditional details including denticulated cornices, brick laid in American bond course, molded brick surrounds, and double hung sash windows.

The Maryland-National Capital Park Police has its headquarters in an old elementary school on Layhill Road.

=== Civic associations ===
In October 2008, the Greater Glenmont Civic Association a 501(c)(3) was founded by retired Navy SEAL Kris Kumaroo, MBA/MS and concerned neighbors to address crime rates in Glenmont and to encourage the Montgomery County government to revitalize the Glenmont area, just as the county had done in the neighboring Wheaton and Silver Spring areas. According to Greater Glenmont Civic Association documents, crime decreased in the Glenmont area by about 15% as of June 2010. The Greater Glenmont Civic Association won several awards and grants for its activities, and its founder featured on the front page of The Washington Post https://blog.frontporchforum.com/2009/05/09/in-tough-economic-times-people-invest-in-community/ The group became defunct in 2014.

Glenmont Exchange was incorporated in 2013 to promote community in the area.

Glenmont Forest Neighbors Civic Association (GFNCA) was created in 2008 to serve the approximately 900 households in the community. The northern boundary is Randolph Road, southern boundary is Henderson and the western boundary is Kendall with Georgia Avenue to the east. This award-winning organization has been able to improve the infrastructure in the community including sidewalks, curbs, street lighting, paving and other traffic and pedestrian safety measures. Quality of life improvements include multiple Little Free Libraries and a new park at the intersection of Georgia and Randolph.

== Housing ==
Glenmont has seven multifamily rental apartment buildings, namely Privacy World, Winexburg Manor, Glenmont Forest, Woodberry Park, The Glen, Westerly Park, and The Oakfield.^{p. 14} The rest of the area consists of single-family homes and some townhouses. Most of the housing west of Georgia Avenue is older and smaller; east of Georgia Avenue, the homes are newer and larger. However, there are a few sites west of Georgia Avenue where homeowners have demolished small, older homes and built larger, newer homes in their place. About 62 percent of the area's housing units are owner-occupied, although this is less than the countywide homeownership rate of 75 percent.

Glenmont Village is a residential subdivision of single family homes on the west side of the center of Glenmont. Financed by the Minneapolis-based Investors Diversified Solutions, Inc., the homes were built in 1949 and 1950. Glenmont Village originally included 30 blocks and approximately 350 buildings. Two-bedroom houses originally sold for $8,890 each. Glenmont Village advertised the two-bedroom Cape Cod-style houses as "modern bungalows". The houses featured full basements, gas heat, hot water, and an expandable attic level with a full-width dormer in the rear. There were four basic varieties of houses. Over the years, the houses have been customized.

== Demographics ==
Historical population
Census	Pop.	Note	%±
2010	13,529		—
2020	16,710		23.5%
U.S. Decennial Census; 2010 2020

Glenmont appeared as a census designated place in the 2010 U.S. census formed along with the Wheaton CDP from part of the deleted Wheaton-Glenmont CDP.

=== Racial and ethnic composition ===
Glenmont CDP, Maryland – Racial and ethnic composition Note: the US Census treats Hispanic/Latino as an ethnic category. This table excludes Latinos from the racial categories and assigns them to a separate category. Hispanics/Latinos may be of any race.
Race / Ethnicity (NH = Non-Hispanic)	Pop 2010	Pop 2020	% 2010	% 2020
White alone (NH)	3,954	3,550	29.23%	21.24%
Black or African American alone (NH)	2,984	4,165	22.06%	24.93%
Native American or Alaska Native alone (NH)	31	11	0.23%	0.07%
Asian alone (NH)	1,927	2,471	14.24%	14.79%
Native Hawaiian or Pacific Islander alone (NH)	14	2	0.10%	0.01%
Other race alone (NH)	73	145	0.54%	0.87%
Mixed race or Multiracial (NH)	309	638	2.28%	3.82%
Hispanic or Latino (any race)	4,237	5,728	31.32%	34.28%
Total	13,529	16,710	100.00%	100.00%

=== 2020 census ===
As of the 2020 census, Glenmont had a population of 16,710. The median age was 38.2 years. 23.0% of residents were under the age of 18 and 14.4% of residents were 65 years of age or older. For every 100 females there were 98.3 males, and for every 100 females age 18 and over there were 94.9 males age 18 and over.

100.0% of residents lived in urban areas, while 0.0% lived in rural areas.

There were 5,369 households in Glenmont, of which 37.4% had children under the age of 18 living in them. Of all households, 54.0% were married-couple households, 16.1% were households with a male householder and no spouse or partner present, and 24.5% were households with a female householder and no spouse or partner present. About 18.4% of all households were made up of individuals and 7.7% had someone living alone who was 65 years of age or older.

There were 5,591 housing units, of which 4.0% were vacant. The homeowner vacancy rate was 1.1% and the rental vacancy rate was 5.5%.

=== Demographic estimates ===
Of Glenmont's residents age 25 or older, 22.2% have earned a graduate or professional degree; 43.3% of the population has a bachelor's degree or higher; 85% has a high school diploma or higher.

3.8% of Glenmont's adults are civilian veterans.

Glenmont's mean family income was $118,095, and its median family income was $94,991. 7.4% of Glenmont's residents' income is below the poverty level.

Of Glenmont's residents who are employed, 51.6% drive alone to work, 12.4% carpool to work, 19.8% use public transportation, 0.6% walk, 0.9% use other means, and 14.8% work at home. Of Glenmont's employed residents, 60.2% work for a private employer, 19.2% are employed by the government, and 9.7% are self-employed. Of Glenmont's residents who are employed, 4,519 work in management, business, sciences, or arts; 1,607 work in service occupations; 1,555 work in sales; 917 work in construction or maintenance, and 643 work in transportation.

Of Glenmont's population, 51% were born in the U.S; and 48% were born outside the U.S. Of Glenmont's residents, 51.2% naturalized U.S. citizens, and 48.8% are not U.S. citizens. Most frequently reported ancestries were 7.4% Subsaharan Africa, 5.1% Irish, 4.4% German, 3.7% English, and 1.9% Polish, and 1.7% Italian.

== Education ==
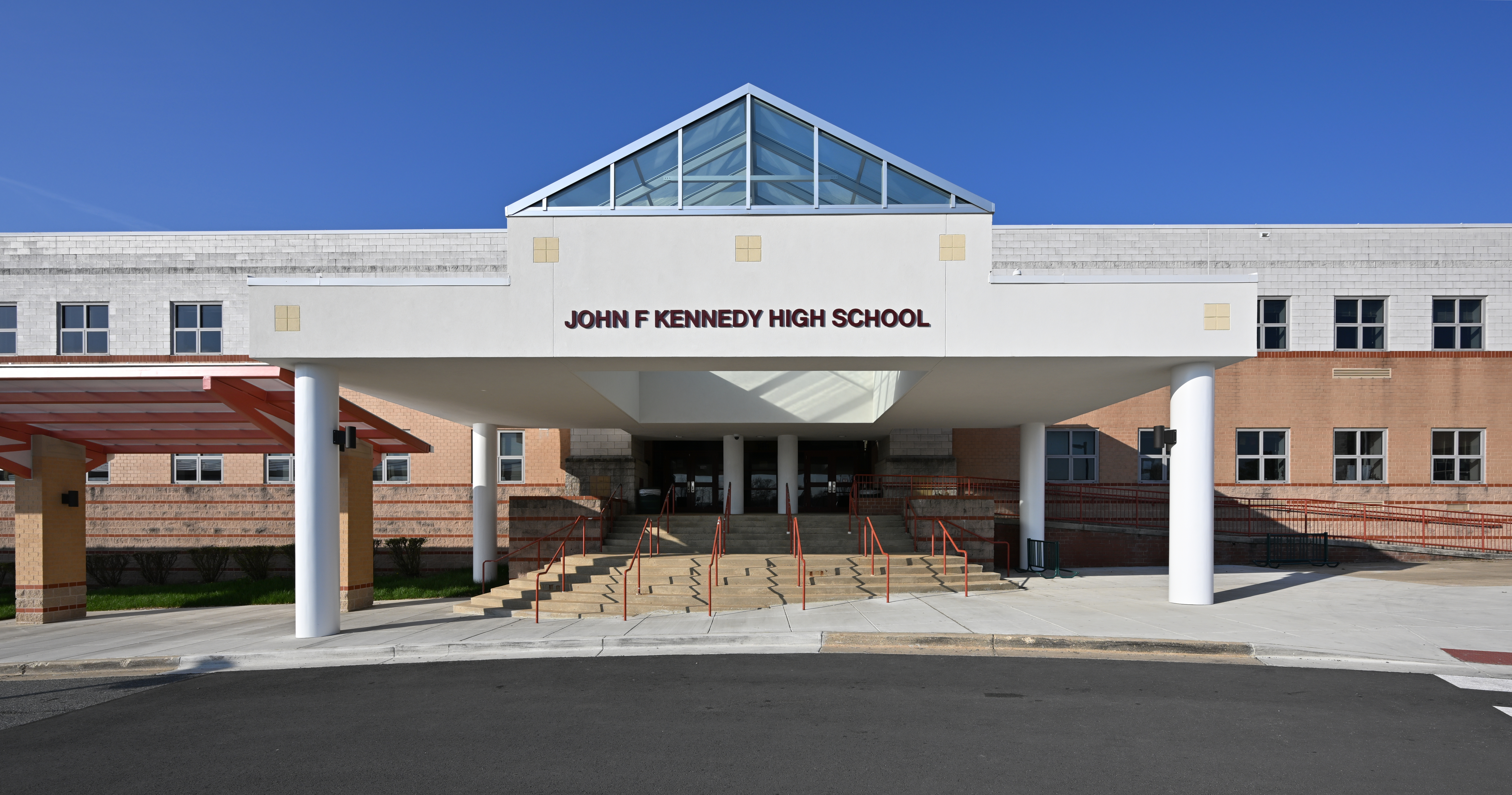
John F. Kennedy High School main entrance

Public schools in Glenmont are operated by the Montgomery County Public Schools. High school students living in the Glenmont area, for the class of 2031 and beyond are zoned to either the Central South region (John F. Kennedy High School, Wheaton High School, Walter Johnson High School, and Woodward High School) or the Southern Region (Northwood High School, Bethesda-Chevy Chase High School, Montgomery Blair High School, Albert Einstein High School, and Walt Whitman High School). Glenmont's middle school students attend Argyle, Odessa Shannon, and A. Mario Loiederman. Glenmont's elementary school students attend Georgian Forest, Weller Road, Glenallan, or Arcola. Barrie School is a private school teaching students in kindergarten through twelfth grade.

Glenmont Elementary School was originally constructed at the intersection of Randolph Road and Georgia Avenue in 1935. It was originally built as a two-story, 9,600-square-foot (892 m^{2}) building. A 4,000-square-foot (372 m^{2}) addition with a gymnasium and office space designed by V.T.H. Bien was built in 1946. Another addition was built in the 1950s. The school's grounds included a play area and a large grassy field. The original school was demolished in 1980, and another nearby school now uses the name.

== Terrain ==
The area consists of modest rolling hills broken by small streams, all of them fed mainly by run-off from storm drainage, although the community contains at least one natural spring still producing aquifer-fed water. All streams to the east side of Glenmont are part of the Anacostia River watershed; they flow into the Northwest Branch of the Anacostia, which empties into the Potomac. Streams to the west of Glenmont generally reach the Potomac River by way of Rock Creek, with Georgia Avenue serving as a rough dividing line between the two drainage areas.

== Parks ==
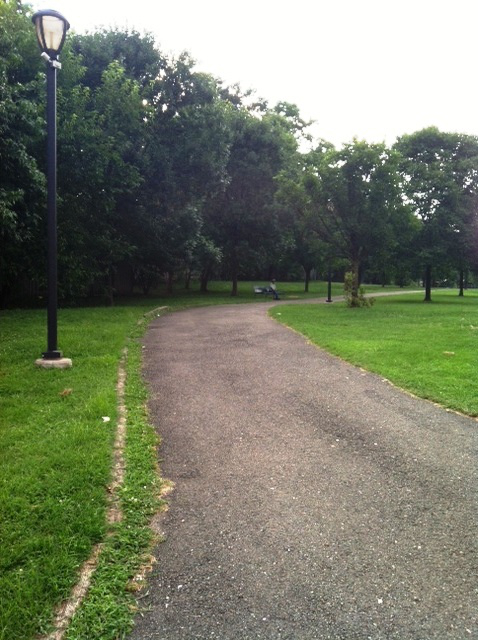
The Glenmont Greenway Urban Park in August 2013.

There are seven public parks located in or near the center of Glenmont: Glenfield Local Park, Saddlebrook Local Park, Glenmont Greenway Urban Park, Glenmont Local Park, Georgian Forest Local Park, Wheaton Local Park, and Valleywood Neighborhood Park. Glenfield Local Park is 11.3 acres (4.6 hectares) in area and features a diamond/rectangular field overlay, a playground, two tennis courts, a picnic shelter, and a petanque court. Saddlebrook Local Park, 14.86 acres (6.01 ha) in area, includes a rectangular field, playground, and a basketball court. Glenmont Greenway Urban Park encompasses c. 3 acres (1.2 ha) of land, and includes an 8-foot-wide (2.4-meter) asphalt trail, and sitting areas. The land is owned by WMATA, but operated and maintained by the Maryland-National Capital Park and Planning Commission (M‐NCPPC) as parkland.

In addition to these three parks, there are 11 parks located within the vicinity of Glenmont, totaling over 1,100 acres (450 hectares) of land. Chief among these are Brookside Gardens and Wheaton Regional Park, both managed by Montgomery Parks, a division of the M-NCPPC.

In March 2021, the Glenmont Pavilion opened. It is a 1,598-square-foot (148 m^{2}) playground located next to the Glenmont Fire Station.

== Points of interest ==
- Brookside Gardens
- Wheaton Regional Park
- Glenmont Greenway Urban Park
- Glenmont Local Park
