= Robin Koontz =

American writer and illustrator

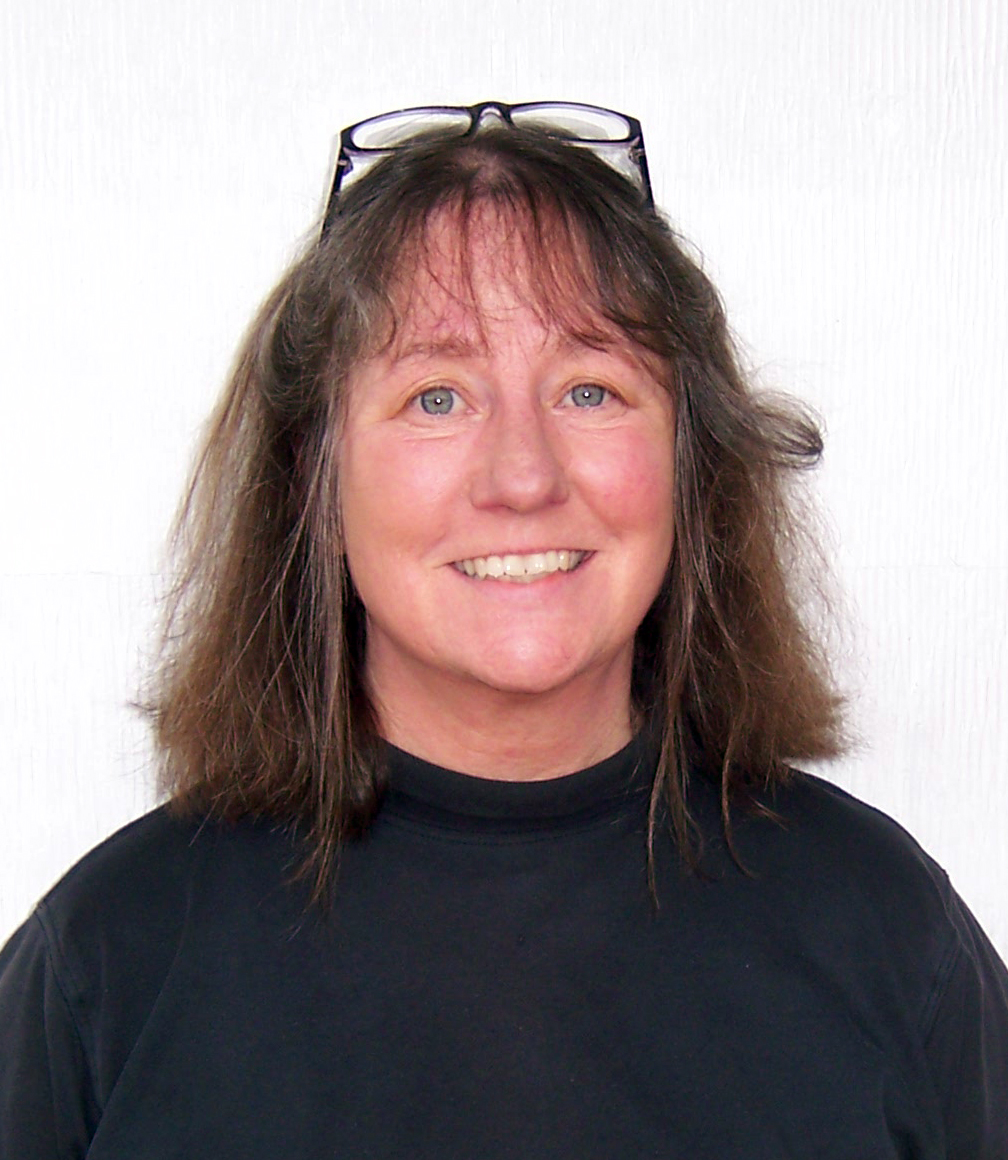
- Children's Book Author and Illustrator Robin Koontz
- Born: July 29, 1954 (age 72); Wheaton, Maryland, U.S.
- Occupations: Illustrator, author
- Writing career
- Period: 1980s-present
- Genres: Fiction, non-fiction, Children's literature
- Website: www.robinkoontz.wordpress.com

Robin Michal Koontz (born July 29, 1954) is an American author and illustrator of picture books and early readers for children as well as non-fiction for middle school readers. Her books are published in English, Spanish, Chinese, and Indonesian. Many of her titles have been reviewed in School Library Journal, Kirkus Reviews, and the CLCD (Children's Literature Comprehension Database).

== Biography ==
Koontz was born in 1954 and grew up in Wheaton, Maryland and Tuscaloosa, Alabama. She attended the Maryland Institute College of Art in Baltimore, Maryland in 1973–74. She currently lives near Noti, Oregon. Koontz served as the Regional Advisor of the Oregon chapter of the Society of Children's Book Writers and Illustrators from 1994 to 2012. She is now Regional Advisor Emeritus.

== Awards ==
In 2018, Robin was inducted into the Albert Einstein High School Arts Hall of Fame for her contributions to visual arts and arts education. What's the Difference Between a Butterfly and a Moth was an International Reading Association Teachers Choice Award in 2010. Leaps and Creeps: How Animals Move to Survive was one of four finalists for the Animal Behavior Society's Outstanding Children's Book Award in 2012.

== Bibliography ==
- Autumn Spawn, A Salmon's Journey (November 2024)
- EE-OH-LAY! What Do Birds Say? (spring 2024)
- The Boxcar Children: The Skeleton Key Mystery (published under the name Gertrude Chandler Warner (September 2020)
- Great Minds and Finds in Australia (Discoveries Around the World) (August 2020)
- Great Minds and Finds in Antarctica (Discoveries Around the World) (August 2020)
- Great Minds and Finds in South America (Discoveries Around the World) (August 2020)
- Sir Pants-a-Lot and Squire Mousekins: The Girl With the Golden Hair (June 2020)
- Invention of Robotics (It Changed the World) (January 2020)
- Invention of Electricity (It Changed the World) (January 2020)
- BUG! (spring 2019)
- Natural Laboratories: Scientists in National Parks - Carlsbad Caverns (spring 2019)
- Natural Laboratories: Scientists in National Parks - Yellowstone (spring 2019)
- Building a Wood-Framed Panelized Yurt (2018)
- Bio-mimic Building & Design (Nature-Inspired Innovations) (2018)
- Bio-inspired Transportation and Communication (Nature-Inspired Innovations) (2018)
- Animal-Inspired Robots (Nature-Inspired Innovations) (2018)
- Nature-inspired Contraptions (Nature-Inspired Innovations) (2018)
- Biomimicry in Medicine (Nature-Inspired Innovations) (2018)
- Nature's Energy (Nature-Inspired Innovations) (2018)
- Disaster Proof! (Define Design) (2017)
- From Here to There (Define Design) (2017)
- Think Like an Engineer (Science Alliance) (2017)
- Great Danes (Dog Applause) (2017)
- French Bulldogs (Dog Applause) (2017)
- Why Do Animals Hide? (2016)
- Why Do Animals Sound Like That? (2016)
- Robotics in the Real World (2016)
- Poop is Power! (2016)
- Our Place in Space (2016)
- What was Hurricane Katrina? (2015)
- Learning About Africa (2015)
- The Science of a Sinkhole (2015)
- The Science of a Tsunami (2015)
- Entomologists (2015)
- Marine Biologists (2015)
- Volcanologists (2015)
- What's Great About Missouri? (2015)
- The Boxcar Children: Mystery of the Stolen Dinosaur Bones (published under the name Gertrude Chandler Warner (2015)
- The Science of a Pandemic (2014)
- How It Works: Binoculars (2014)
- How It Works: TV Remote (2014)
- How It Works: Computer Mouse (2014)
- The Boxcar Children: Mystery of the Wild West Bandit (published under the name Gertrude Chandler Warner (2014)
- The Boxcar Children: Mystery of the Fallen Treasure (published under the name Gertrude Chandler Warner (2013)
- Indigenous Peoples (2013)
- Your Family Tree (2013)
- Light in the Real World (2013)
- Paul Bunyan and Babe the Blue Ox (2012)
- Run…It's a Bee! (2012)
- Robin Hood (2012)
- Rumpelstiltskin (2012)
- Leaps and Creeps: How Animals Move to Survive (2011)
- Spits and Squirts: How Animals Squirt to Survive (2011)
- Sniffs and Stinks: How Animals Use Odor to Survive (2011)
- Screams and Songs: How Animals Communicate to Survive (2011)
- Movers and Makers: How Animals Build and Use Tools to Survive (2011)
- The King's New Clothes (2011)
- Lizzie Little: The Sky is Falling! (2011)
- Goldie Duck and the Three Beavers (2011)
- The Three Little Recyclers (2011)
- Old McDoggle Had a Farm (2011)
- Jill and the Beanstalk (2011)
- Cinderella Zelda(2011)
- Water Goes Round -The Water Cycle (2011)
- Hide and Seek Moon - The Moon Phases (2011)
- Building a Small Cable Suspension Bridge - with the Cable Locking System (co-author) (2011)
- Our Amazing States Six nonfiction early readers (2010)
- Pick a Perfect Pumpkin: Learning about Pumpkin Harvests (2010)
- Apples, Apples, Everywhere: Learning about Apple Harvests (2010)
- Furlock and Muttson Mysteries Six fiction early readers (2010)
- What's the Difference Between a Butterfly and a Moth? (2010)
- Butterfly Spring (2009)
- Tai Chi for Fun! (2008)
- Jewelry Making for Fun! (2008)
- Who's Hiding? (Illustrator) (2008)
- Composting: Nature's Recyclers (2007)
- Erosion: Changing the Earth's Surface (2007)
- Creepy Crawly Colors (2006)
- Up All Night Counting (2006)
- On Her Way: Stories and Poems About Growing Up Girl (Contributor) (2004)
- It Takes Three (illustrator) (2003)
- How is a Moose Like a Goose? (2003)
- Why a Dog? By A. Cat (2000) (2013)
- The Complete Backyard Nature Activity Book (1998) (2012)
- Chicago and the Cat Series of five early readers (1993-1997) (2013)
- I Don't Like Peas (illustrator) (1993)
- Music in the Night (illustrator) (1993)
- I See Something You Don't See (1992)
- In a Cabin In a Wood (illustrator) (1991)
- Victoria Flies High (illustrator) (1990)
- This Old Man (illustrator) (1988)
- Dinosaur Dream (1988)
- Pussycat Ate the Dumplings (illustrator) (1987)

== Interviews ==
- Mihnea Simandan, Voicu. ""The devices that deliver a book might change, but I believe that kids will still read." – Interview with Robin Koontz. Voicu Mihnea Simandan. July 11, 2011.
- Harrison, David. Robin Koontz today. Children's Author David L. Harrison's Blog. October 29, 2010.
