= Laurie Ann Haus =

American singer and vocalist

Laurie Ann Haus is an American singer and vocalist. She is a solo musical artist, with music released under her name Laurie Ann Haus with her band Todesbonden. Her vocals can be heard on soundtracks for Starcraft II, World of Warcraft, Showtime's series The Borgias and more. She also created the Vocal Studio Series: Laurie library with the popular virtual instrument and sound library manufacturer 8Dio.

== Biography ==
Haus was born in Wheaton, Maryland. She began her musical career on the industry side by booking touring bands. At college she majored in Vocal Performance and began to compose music for her band, Todesbonden. In 2003, she released her first EP, Stormbringer, then "Sleep Now Quiet Forest" (2008). She has since released the single "The Wood Maiden," and made guest appearances on soundtracks.

== Session vocals on video game and movie soundtracks ==
- (2018) Redbad, Composer- Trevor Morris
- (2018) The Great Barrier Reef, Composer - Dale Cornelius
- (2018) The Story of Earth Composer -Dale Cornelius
- (2018) Starcraft 2: Legacy of the Void, Composer - Neal Acree
- (2015) Uranium: Twisting the Dragon's Tail, Composer - Dale Cornelius
- (2014) World of Warcraft: Warlords of Draenor, Lords of War: Part 5, Composer - Neal Acree
- (2014) Diablo 3: Reaper of Souls, Composer- Neal Acree
- (2014) Falcon Rising: Composer - Neal Acree
- (2013) JFK: The Smoking Gun, Composer- Dale Cornelius
- (2013) Starcraft 2: Heart of the Swarm, Composer - Neal Acree
- (2013) The Infiltrators- Dirk Ehlert
- (2012) The Scorpion King: Battle for Redemption - Trevor Morris
- (2012) Australia on Trial, Composer - Dale Cornelius
- (2011) Showtime's Series The Borgias (Season 1, Episode 5) Composer- Trevor Morris
- (2011) Assassination Games, Composer, Neal Acree
- (2011) Weapon, Composer - Neal Acree
- (2011) National Lampoon's: The Legend of Awesomest Maximus (Comedy Central) Composer -Scott Glasgow
- (2010) World of Warcraft: Cataclysm (Track 17 - Nightsong, Blizzard Entertainment) Composer - Neal Acree
- (2010) SyFy Channel Original Movie, Witchville, Composer- Neal Acree
- (2010) Starcraft 2: Wings of Liberty (Tracks Blizzard Entertainment) Composer Neal Acree
- (2010) Witchville (SyFy Channel), Composer: Neal Acree

== Discography and Releases ==
With Laurie Ann Haus

- The Wood Maiden -Single (2015)

With Todesbonden:

- Sleep Now, Quiet Forest (2008)
- Stormbringer (2003)

== Vocal Library ==
- 8DIO Studio Vocal Series: Laurie (Created by Laurie Ann Haus and 8Dio)

== As guest vocalist ==
With Realms of Odoric

- The Third Age (2018)

With Jo Blankenburg

- Cronos (2017)

With Stephan Baer

- Song: Orphic

With Brand X (2016)

- Battle for Dawn- Song: Lumos

With Brand X (2016)

- Architect Series: ETHEREAL

With Driftmoon

- (R)evolution (2016)

With Govinda

- Decadence (2016)

With Tina Guo (2014)

- Composers for Charity, Composer Neal Acree, Song: Oceans of Time

With Saturnus

- Saturn In Ascension (2012), Song: A Lonely Passage

== Personal life ==
Haus lives with her husband, guitarist Jason Aaron Wood, in Maryland.
