= Maryland Route 182 =

State highway in Montgomery County, Maryland

Maryland Route 182
- Maryland Route 182 highlighted in red

Route information
- Maintained by MDSHA
- Length: 6.54 mi (10.53 km)
- Existed: 1927–present

Major junctions
- South end: MD 97 in Glenmont
- MD 200 Toll in Aspen Hill; MD 28 near Norwood
- North end: MD 108 in Olney

Location
- Country: United States
- State: Maryland
- Counties: Montgomery

Highway system
- Maryland highway system; Interstate; US; State; Scenic Byways
← MD 181	→ MD 185

Maryland Route 182 (MD 182) is a state highway in the U.S. state of Maryland. Known for most of its length as Layhill Road, the highway runs 6.54 miles (10.53 km) from MD 97 in Glenmont north to MD 108 in Olney. MD 182 connects the northeastern Montgomery County communities of Glenmont, Layhill, Norwood, Sandy Spring, and Olney. The highway was constructed in the early 1920s. MD 182 was expanded to a four-lane divided highway from Glenmont to the site of its interchange with MD 200 in the late 1980s and early 1990s.

== Route description ==
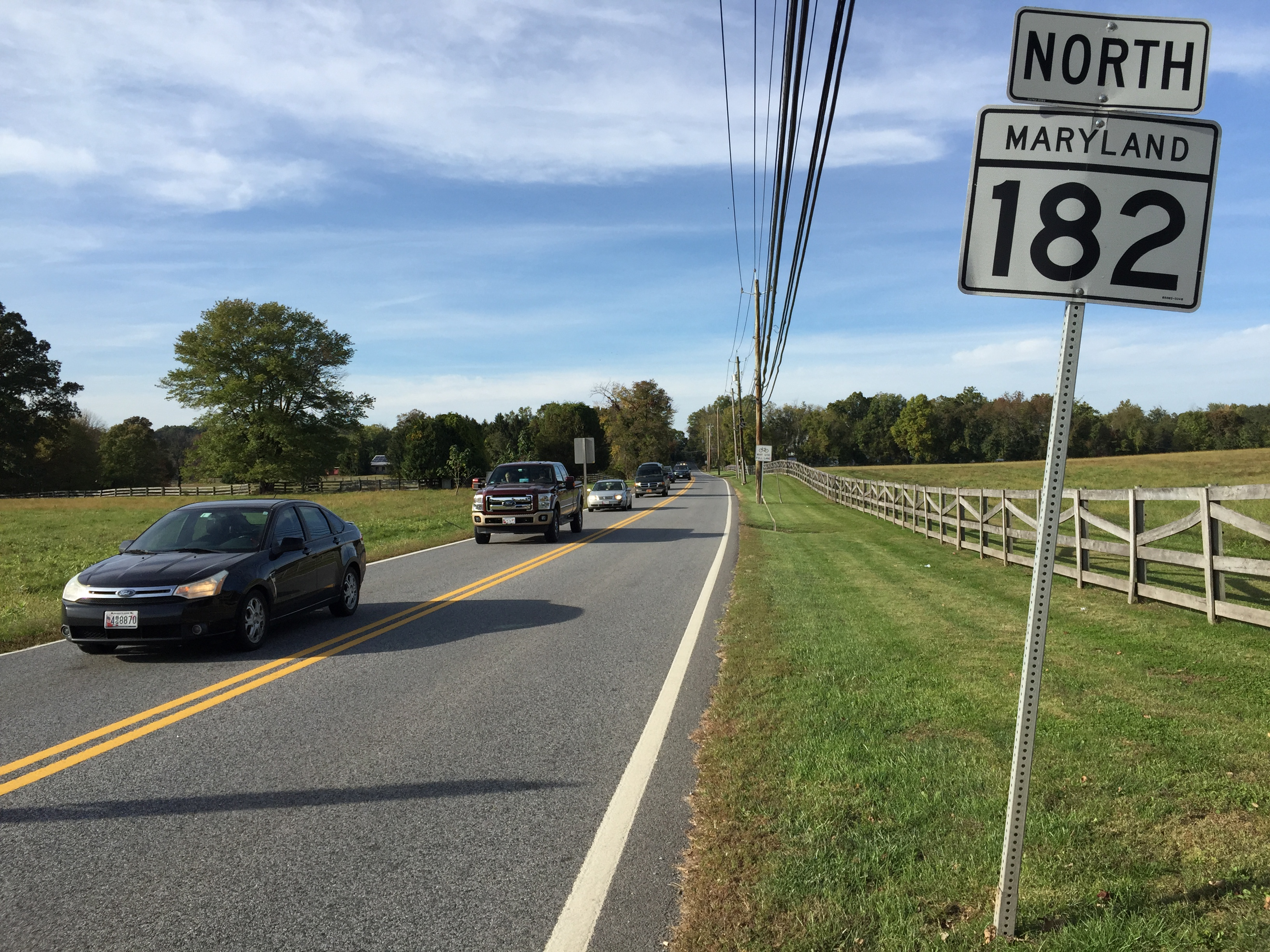
View north along MD 182 near Ednor Road in Sandy Spring

MD 182 begins at an acute intersection with MD 97 (Georgia Avenue) in Glenmont. The highway heads north as Layhill Road, a six-lane divided highway that passes the Glenmont station at the eastern terminus of the Washington Metro's Red Line. MD 182 reduces to four lanes north of Glenallen Avenue. The highway crosses Bel Pre Creek and intersects Bel Pre Road and Bonifant Road at the hamlet of Layhill; Bonifant Road leads to the National Capital Trolley Museum. North of Layhill, MD 182 meets MD 200 (Intercounty Connector) at a diamond interchange and intersects the eastern terminus of a section of the ICC Trail before it reduces to a two-lane undivided road just south of its bridge across Buckhorn Branch of the Northwest Branch Anacostia River, which parallels the highway to the east. The highway temporarily expands to a four-lane divided highway at its intersection with Norbeck Road, which heads west as MD 28. MD 182 continues to the hamlet of Norwood, where the highway intersects Norwood Road. The road continues straight as Ednor Road and MD 182 turns north onto Norwood Road. North of the Sandy Spring Friends School, Norwood Road veers north as a county highway toward Sandy Spring. MD 182 continues along Dr. Bird Road, which carries the state highway northwest to its northern terminus at MD 108 (Olney Sandy Spring Road) opposite the Olney Theatre Center for the Arts on the eastern edge of Olney.

MD 182 is a part of the National Highway System as a principal arterial from its southern terminus at Glenmont to MD 28 near Norwood.

== History ==
Layhill Road and Norwood Road were once part of the Clarksville Pike, which originally connected Ellicott City and Clarksville. In 1889, it was extended to Ashton and Unity. The road was maintained by the Union Turnpike Company, which also operated the Brookeville Turnpike and a turnpike from Olney to Ashton.

The road was included as part of the Maryland State Roads Commission's original state road system in 1909. However, by 1915, the highway was deemed not to form a necessary part of the main arterial system. MD 182 was paved as a macadam road between 1921 and 1923. The state highway designation was removed from Norwood Road and placed on Dr. Bird Road north of the Norwood–Dr. Bird intersection in 1977.

MD 182 was expanded to a divided highway from MD 97 to just north of Bel Pre Road and Bonifant Road in 1989. The divided highway section was extended to just south of Buckhorn Branch in 1991. MD 182 was expanded to a divided highway at the MD 28 intersection in 2001 and 2002. The highway's interchange with MD 200 was under construction in 2010 and opened in 2011.

== Junction list ==
The entire route is in Montgomery County.

Location	mi	km	Destinations	Notes
Glenmont	0.00	0.00	MD 97 (Georgia Avenue) – Aspen Hill, Wheaton	Southern terminus
Aspen Hill	2.89	4.65	MD 200 Toll (Intercounty Connector) to I-95 / I-270	MD 200 Exit 10; E-ZPass or Video Tolling
Norwood	4.41	7.10	MD 28 west (Norbeck Road) / Norbeck Road east – Rockville, Laurel	Eastern terminus of MD 28
Olney	6.54	10.53	MD 108 (Olney Sandy Spring Road) – Olney, Sandy Spring	Northern terminus
1.000 mi = 1.609 km; 1.000 km = 0.621 mi: Electronic toll collection

== Auxiliary route ==
MD 182A is the designation for Old Layhill Road, a 0.28-mile (0.45 km) one-lane service road that parallels the northbound side of MD 182 from north of Glenallen Avenue to Briggs Road in Glenmont.
