= Wheaton–Glenmont, Maryland =

- Former census-designated place
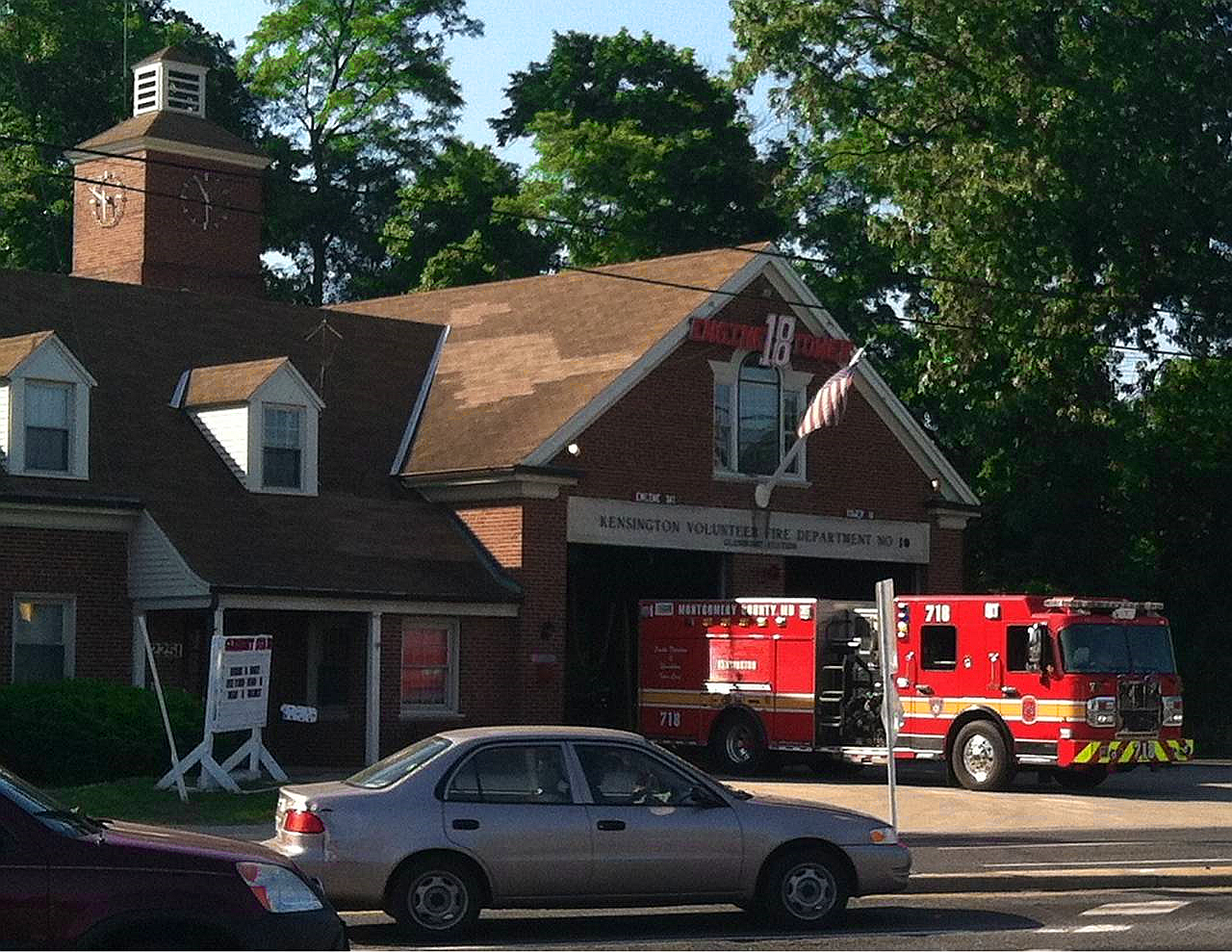
- The Kensington fire station in May 2013.

- Location of Wheaton–Glenmont, Maryland
- Coordinates: 39°03′27″N 77°03′10″W
- Country: United States
- State: Maryland
- County: Montgomery

Area
  - Total: 10.2 sq mi (26.5 km^{2})
  - Land: 10.2 sq mi (26.5 km^{2})
  - Water: 0 sq mi (0.0 km^{2})

Population (2000)
  - Total: 57,694
  - Density: 5,635/sq mi (2,175.7/km^{2})
- Time zone: UTC−5 (Eastern (EST))
  - Summer (DST): UTC−4 (EDT)
- FIPS code: 24-83837

Wheaton–Glenmont was a census-designated place (CDP) in Montgomery County, Maryland, at the 2000 United States census, at which time it had a population of 57,694. For the 2010 U.S. Census the area was split into the two census-designated places of Wheaton and Glenmont.

== Geography ==
Wheaton–Glenmont is located at 39°3′13″N 77°3′33″W (39.053658, −77.059071).

According to the United States Census Bureau, the place had a total area of 10.2 square miles (26 km^{2}), all of it land.

== Demographics ==
As of the census of 2000, there were 57,694 people, 19,596 households, and 13,971 families living in the area. The population density was 5,635.1 people per square mile (2,175.4/km^{2}). There were 20,125 housing units at an average density of 1,965.7 per square mile (758.8/km^{2}). The racial makeup of the area was 49.92% White, 18.83% African American, 0.40% Native American, 12.16% Asian, 0.06% Pacific Islander, 13.26% from other races, and 5.37% from two or more races. Hispanic or Latino of any race were 25.92% of the population.

There were 19,596 households, out of which 34.4% had children under the age of 18 living with them, 52.5% were married couples living together, 13.7% had a female householder with no husband present, and 28.7% were non-families. 22.1% of all households were made up of individuals, and 8.1% had someone living alone who was 65 years of age or older. The average household size was 2.93 and the average family size was 3.39.

In the specified area the population was spread out, with 24.9% under the age of 18, 8.4% from 18 to 24, 32.7% from 25 to 44, 22.2% from 45 to 64, and 11.8% who were 65 years of age or older. The median age was 36 years. For every 100 females there were 95.7 males. For every 100 females age 18 and over, there were 93.0 males.

The median income for a household in the area was $59,211, and the median income for a family was $62,295. Males had a median income of $39,064 versus $32,578 for females. The per capita income for the area was $23,927. About 6.4% of families and 8.5% of the population were below the poverty line, including 11.0% of those under age 18 and 7.1% of those age 65 or over.
