= Wheaton, Maryland =

- Census-designated place
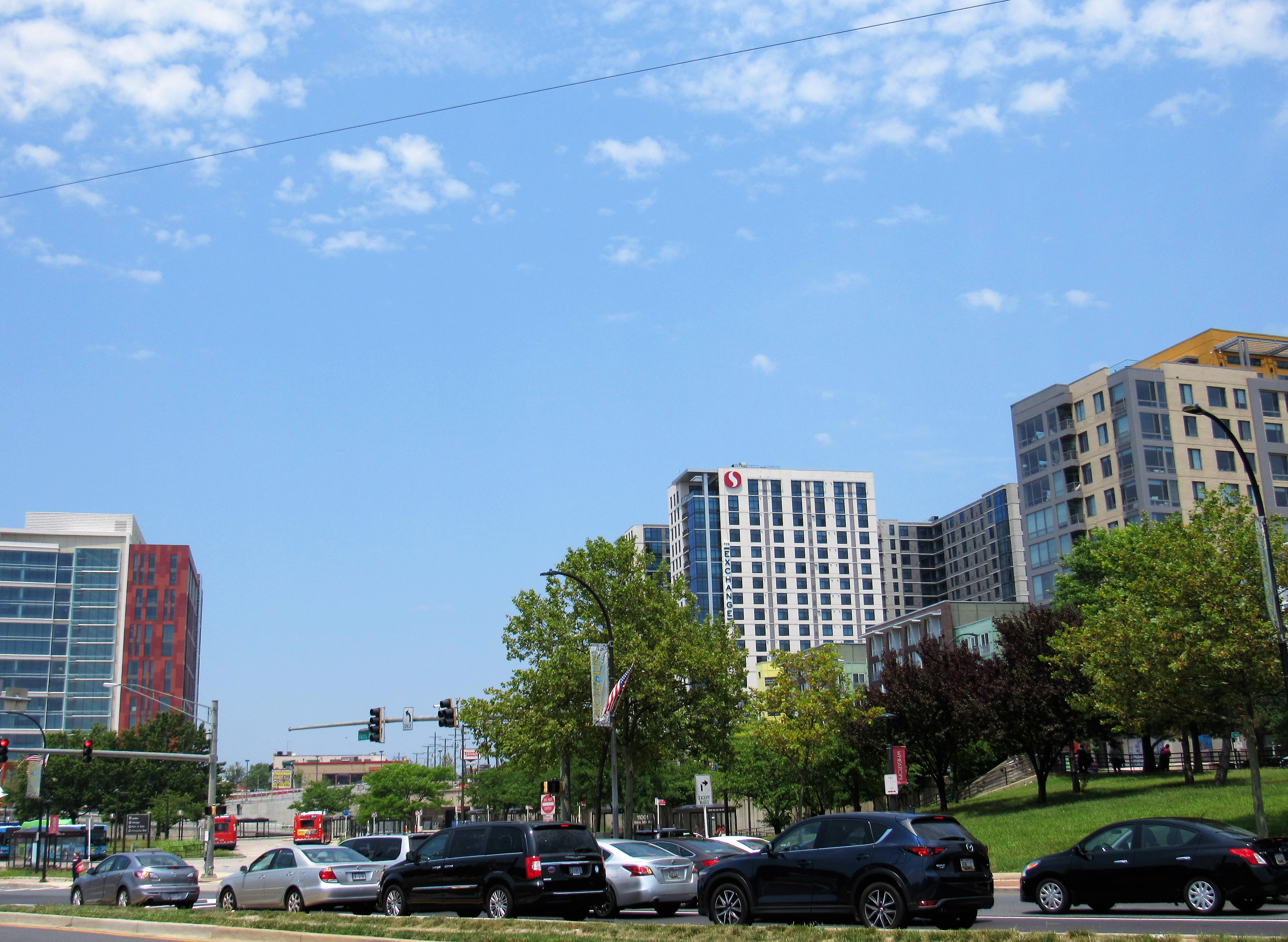
- Downtown Wheaton

- Location of Wheaton, Maryland Wheaton (the United States)
- Coordinates: 39°02′57″N 77°03′26″W
- Country: United States
- State: Maryland
- County: Montgomery

Area
  - Total: 6.94 sq mi (17.98 km^{2})
  - Land: 6.90 sq mi (17.87 km^{2})
  - Water: 0.042 sq mi (0.11 km^{2})
- Elevation: 384 ft (117 m)

Population (2020)
  - Total: 52,150
  - Density: 7,560.4/sq mi (2,919.09/km^{2})
- Time zone: UTC−5 (Eastern (EST))
  - Summer (DST): UTC−4 (EDT)
- FIPS code: 24-83775
- GNIS feature ID: 2652342

Wheaton is a census-designated place and Maryland Arts and Entertainment District located in Montgomery County, Maryland, United States, situated north of Washington, D.C., and northwest of downtown Silver Spring. It is primarily known as an urban district centered around the Westfield Wheaton mall. The district takes its name from Frank Wheaton (1833–1903), a career officer in the United States Army and volunteer from Rhode Island in the Union Army who rose to the rank of major-general while serving before, during, and after the Civil War.

Wheaton had a population of 52,150 at the 2020 census. The United States Postal Service has assigned ZIP code 20902 to Wheaton, but the Wheaton Post Office is a part of the larger Silver Spring area. Downtown Wheaton is located around the triangle formed by Veirs Mill Road, University Boulevard, and Georgia Avenue.

== History ==
=== Three roads ===
Wheaton developed from Leesborough (named in 1826), a small business district that grew near the junction of three major roads. The first of these is Brookeville Pike (also known as the Washington-Brookeville Pike and later as the Union Turnpike, now Georgia Avenue) a north–south toll thoroughfare running from Washington, D.C., to Brookeville and eventually to Baltimore.

The second road, Veirs Mill Road (named after a grist and sawmill built on Rock Creek by Samuel Clark Veirs in 1838), was one portion of a much longer thoroughfare running west to Rockville, Maryland, and thence towards the Potomac River and subsequently to Virginia via ferry crossings. This was also known as the "City Road" in Rockville, and around the time of the Civil War it was known also as the "New Cut Road."

The last of these roads was known as Old Bladensburg Road (now University Boulevard) which, as it does in present day, connected Georgetown, Bethesda, Chevy Chase, Kensington, Wheaton, Silver Spring, and Bladensburg.

=== Mitchell's Crossroads ===
The business district became known as Mitchell's Crossroads, after Robert T. Mitchell's tavern, which sat at the northeast corner of Union Turnpike and Old Bladensburg Road.

In 1864, Confederate General Jubal Early led troops through the area on their way to attack Washington, D.C. Union General Frank Wheaton and his division beat them back at the Battle of Fort Stevens.

Mitchell's Tavern was destroyed by a fire in 1940.

=== After the Civil War ===
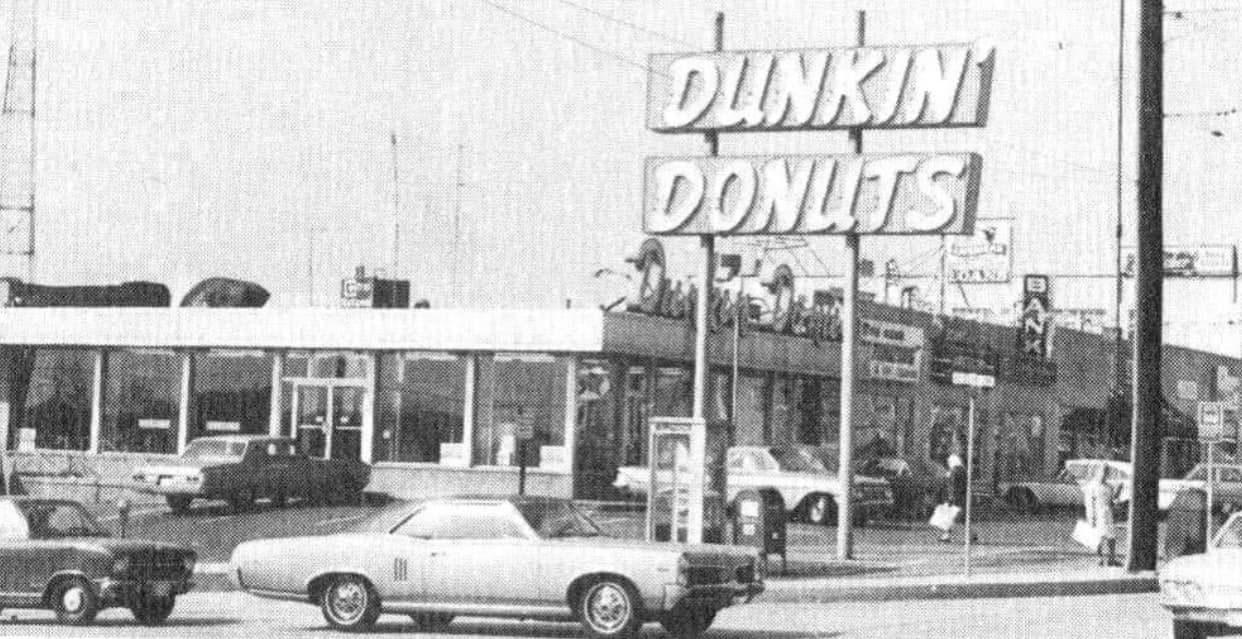
A Dunkin' Donuts store on Wheaton's Georgia Avenue c. 1967; the restaurant is still operating there today.

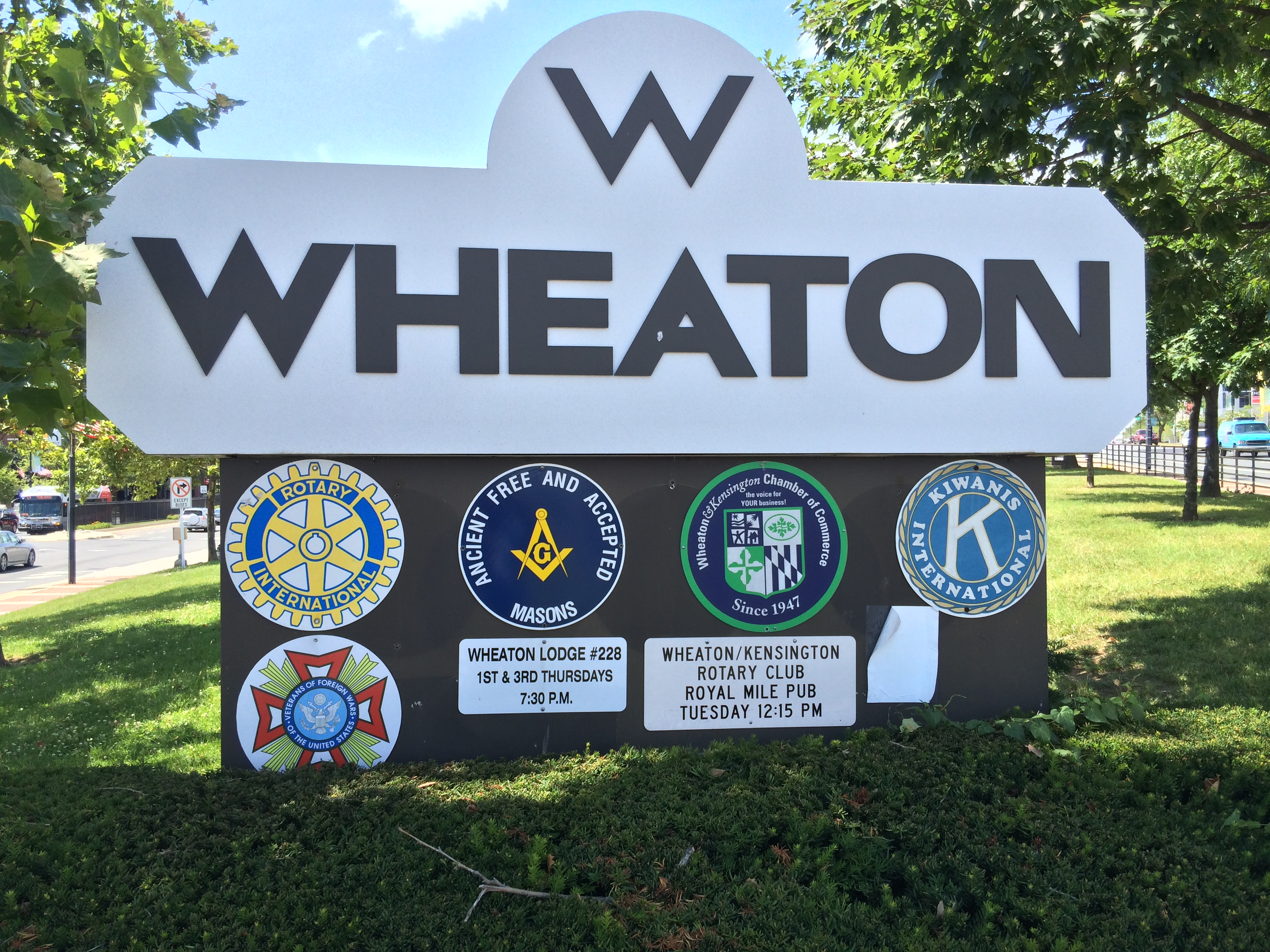
Former entrance sign for Wheaton, Maryland. This sign has since been replaced.

After the Civil War, the area's first postmaster was war veteran George F. Plyer, who in October 1869, renamed the post office in honor of his commanding officer, General Wheaton.

For many years, the Wheaton area was only lightly used, mostly for farming. In 1871, the first African American Church, Allen Chapel AME Church, was established. This religious body maintained its presence in the Wheaton community until 2000, at which time the New Creation Church purchased the property.

Into the early 20th century, civic growth in the area was slow, with a few new businesses established along the major roads. But after World War II, Wheaton quickly expanded. The area's first modern post office opened in 1947 (earlier records show that the post office had used the Leesborough name). In addition, the Washington Suburban Sanitary Commission (WSSC) was active, adding utility infrastructure to the area. As part of that work, and just north of Wheaton, the prominent Glenmont Water Tower was constructed in 1947. Wheaton was steadily built-out by several developers (Kay Construction Co. in particular), becoming a part of the modern-day suburbs of Washington, D.C. Today, as an unincorporated town, Wheaton is governed locally by the civic government of Montgomery County. For some modern information databases, such as official real estate records, Wheaton (along with several neighboring locales) is considered to be a sub-section of larger Silver Spring.

== Demographics ==
Historical population
Census	Pop.	Note	%±
2010	48,284		—
2020	52,150		8.0%
U.S. Decennial Census; 2010 2020

In the 1950s the area was developed with Cape Cod, ranch houses, and split-level homes purchased by white, largely middle-class, families; a mix of blue-collar and white-collar workers. Now, more of this older housing stock is owned or rented by a diverse population.

Wheaton first appeared as a census designated place in the 2010 U.S. census formed from part of the deleted Wheaton-Glenmont CDP and from part of the Forest Glen CDP.

=== Racial and ethnic composition ===
Wheaton CDP, Maryland – Racial and ethnic composition Note: the US Census treats Hispanic/Latino as an ethnic category. This table excludes Latinos from the racial categories and assigns them to a separate category. Hispanics/Latinos may be of any race.
Race / Ethnicity (NH = Non-Hispanic)	Pop 2010	Pop 2020	% 2010	% 2020
White alone (NH)	12,414	10,972	25.71%	21.04%
Black or African American alone (NH)	8,499	9,458	17.60%	18.14%
Native American or Alaska Native alone (NH)	89	79	0.18%	0.15%
Asian alone (NH)	5,782	5,934	11.97%	11.38%
Native Hawaiian or Pacific Islander alone (NH)	32	21	0.07%	0.04%
Other race alone (NH)	249	461	0.52%	0.88%
Mixed race or Multiracial (NH)	1,064	1,737	2.20%	3.33%
Hispanic or Latino (any race)	20,155	23,488	41.74%	45.04%
Total	48,284	52,150	100.00%	100.00%

As of 2010–2020, Wheaton is 23.8% White, 40.5% Hispanic or Latino, 18.5% African American (4.1% Ethiopian, 1.3% Jamaican), and 13.9% Asian (4.42% Vietnamese, 3.72% Filipino, 1.67% Chinese, 1.59% Indian). 2.4% of the population identified as mixed-race. The largest immigrant groups were from El Salvador, Ethiopia, Vietnam, the Philippines, and Honduras.

=== 2020 census ===
As of the 2020 census, Wheaton had a population of 52,150. The median age was 36.3 years. 23.4% of residents were under the age of 18 and 12.0% of residents were 65 years of age or older. For every 100 females there were 96.3 males, and for every 100 females age 18 and over there were 94.5 males age 18 and over.

100.0% of residents lived in urban areas, while 0.0% lived in rural areas.

There were 16,276 households in Wheaton, of which 37.9% had children under the age of 18 living in them. Of all households, 47.9% were married-couple households, 16.9% were households with a male householder and no spouse or partner present, and 29.1% were households with a female householder and no spouse or partner present. About 22.9% of all households were made up of individuals and 8.1% had someone living alone who was 65 years of age or older.

There were 16,803 housing units, of which 3.1% were vacant. The homeowner vacancy rate was 0.8% and the rental vacancy rate was 3.6%.

Racial composition as of the 2020 census
Race	Number	Percent
White	13,174	25.3%
Black or African American	9,764	18.7%
American Indian and Alaska Native	805	1.5%
Asian	6,012	11.5%
Native Hawaiian and Other Pacific Islander	39	0.1%
Some other race	14,728	28.2%
Two or more races	7,628	14.6%

=== 2010 census ===
Between 2000 and 2010, Wheaton's Hispanic population has increased from 29% to 42%. Wheaton's Hispanic population is highly ethnically diverse - as of the 2010 Census, Wheaton is 18.5% Salvadoran, 3.2% Mexican, 2.8% Guatemalan, 2.3% Peruvian, 2.3% Honduran, 1.3% Dominican, 1.2% Nicaraguan, 1% Bolivian, 0.9% Colombian, 0.8% Puerto Rican, 0.7% Ecuadorians, 0.3% Cuban, 0.3% Chilean, and 0.3% Argentine, all numbering over 100 residents. 16.5% of Wheaton's residents were White Hispanics/Latinos, 1% were Afro-Hispanics/Afro-Latinos, 0.6% were American Indian or Alaska Native Hispanics/Latinos, 0.2% were Asian-American Hispanics/Latinos, 3% were Hispanics/Latinos of two or more races, and 20.5% were Hispanics/Latinos from some other race.

In 2020, local prosecutors said in a 28-page indictment that 21 MS-13 Gang members had committed crimes against 18 victims, including 9 in Wheaton. The crimes against Wheaton residents includes murder, attempted murder with a gun, assault and racketeering.

== Features ==
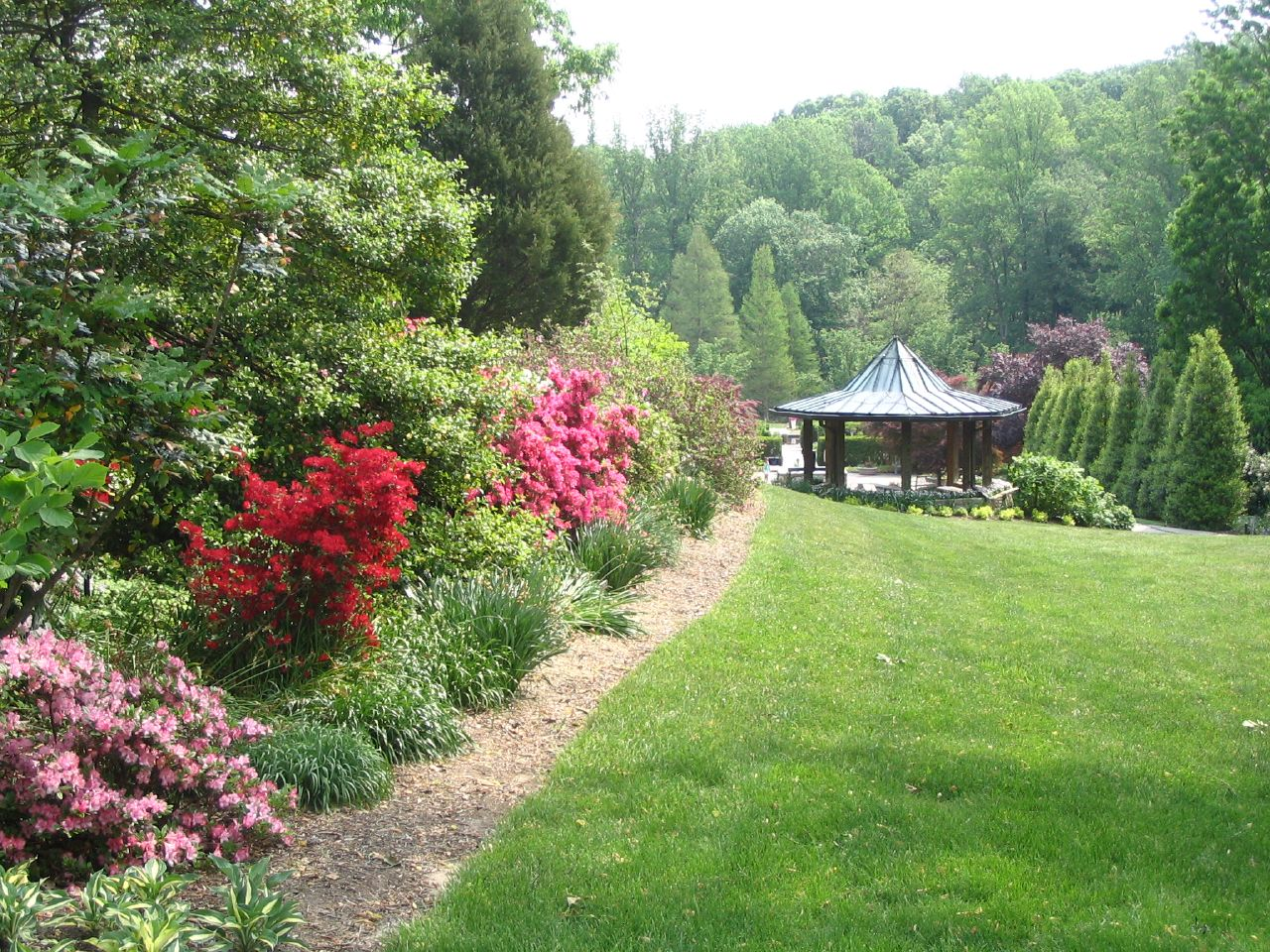
Brookside Gardens in Wheaton Regional Park

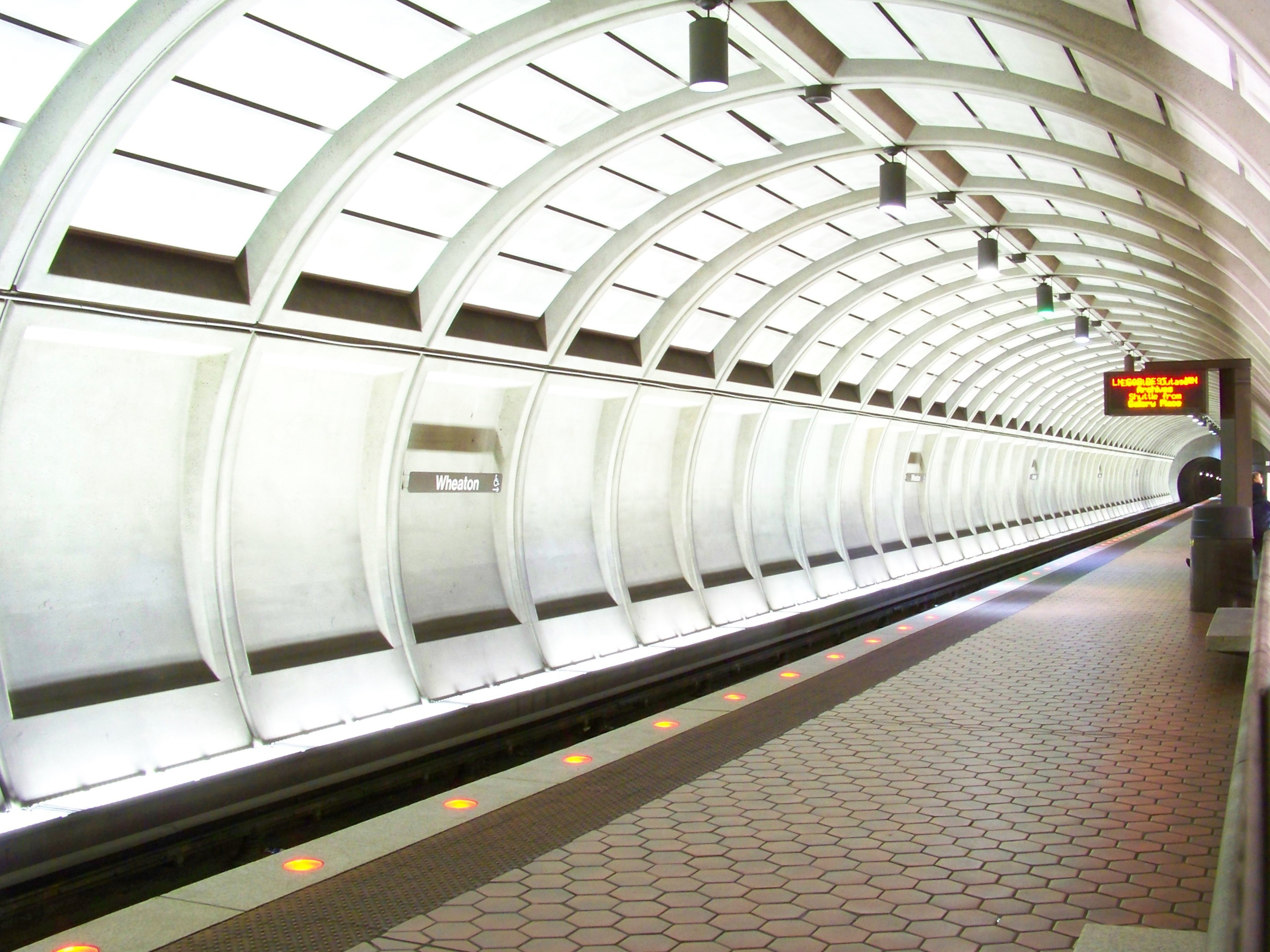
Platform at Wheaton station

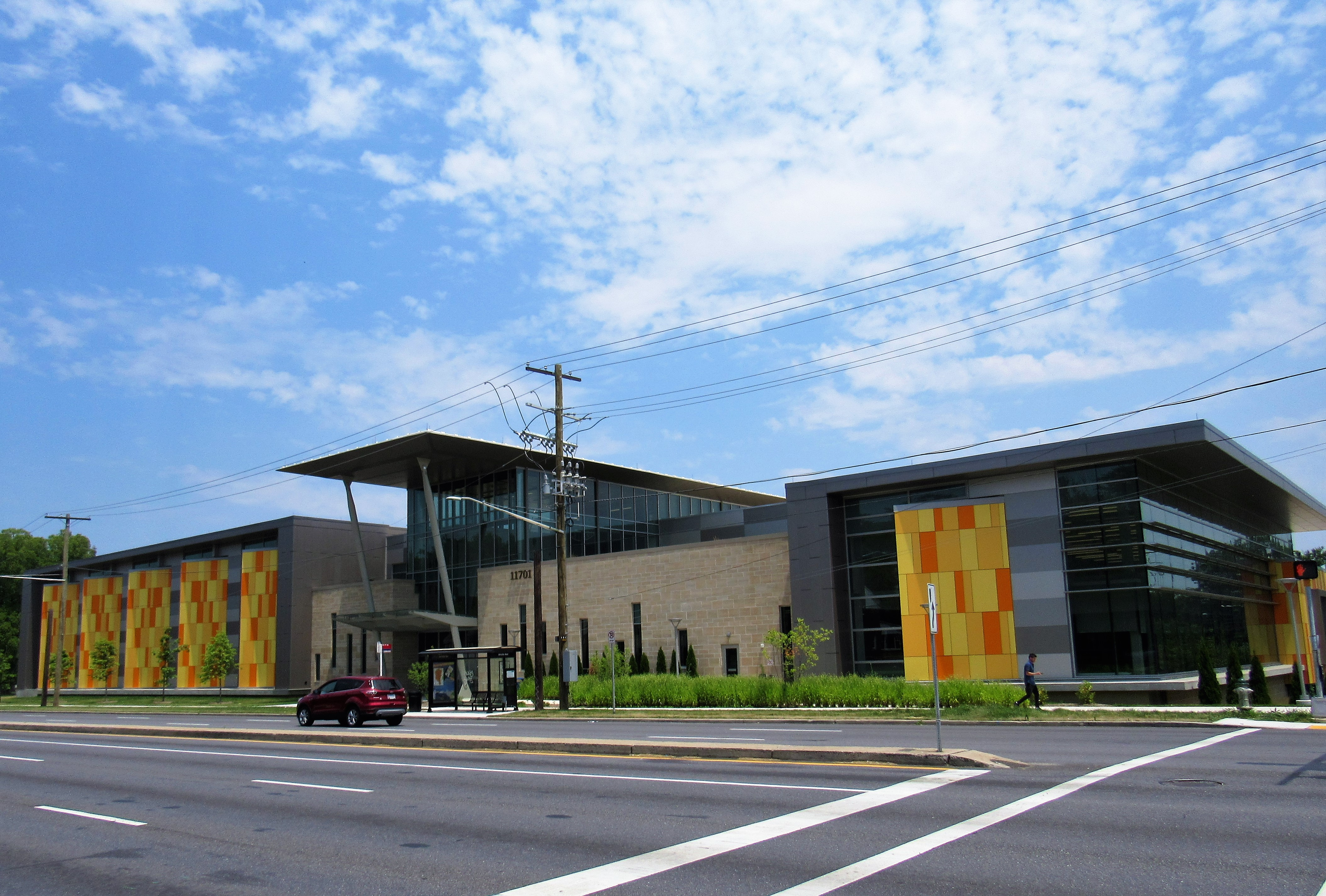
The New Library and Recreation Center, Which Opened on September 8, 2019.

Wheaton is home to the Wheaton Regional Park, which includes a nature center; riding stables; dog park; a picnic area with carousel and miniature train; an athletic complex with indoor tennis, ice rink, inline skating rink, and ball fields; and Brookside Gardens, Montgomery County's 50-acre (200,000-m^{2}) public display garden. Much of Wheaton was developed in the 1950s. In the 1960s, its shopping center, Wheaton Plaza (now known as Westfield Wheaton), was the largest in the Maryland suburbs of Washington, D.C. The Wheaton Volunteer Rescue Squad is one of the busiest (11,000 calls in 2007) predominantly volunteer fire departments in Montgomery County.

The diversity of the neighborhood is reflected by the high concentration of various ethnic restaurants located in Wheaton.

It is served by the Red Line of the Washington Metro system. Spanning 508 feet (155 m), the Wheaton station has the longest escalator in the Western Hemisphere.

Since Wheaton has the highest location in the Washington, D.C., area, it was also the home of the first television license in the United States. Using the call sign W3XK, Charles Francis Jenkins began broadcasting from his home at the corner of Windham Lane and Georgia Ave. starting on July 2, 1928.

Other points of interest include

- The Gilchrist Center for Cultural Diversity - Named after former Montgomery County Executive Charles W. Gilchrist, opened Sept. 8th 2001, it provides services to an increasing immigrant population in Montgomery County.
- Wheaton Library and Recreation Center opened on September 8, 2019, replaced the old library and Wheaton Youth Center.
- Holy Cross Health Cancer Center, opened on February 23, 2023. (former Ana G. Méndez University System and Circuit City.)

== Designation as a Maryland Arts and Entertainment District ==
Wheaton has been designated by the State of Maryland as an Arts and Entertainment District, joining Silver Spring and Bethesda as the third district in Montgomery County to receive the distinction. The Arts and Entertainment District designation provides artists working in that area with an income tax break. Developers who create spaces for artists to live and work can be exempt from paying certain property taxes on the value of the renovations for up to 10 years. Designated districts are exempt from admissions and amusement taxes. Every September, the Wheaton Arts Parade & Festival attracts hundreds of visual and performing artists to downtown Wheaton for a parade of floats, bands, dancers, artists and community organizations that has become a local tradition.

== Notable people ==
- Benjamin F. Kramer
- Bill Quinter
- Chas Gessner
- Diana Barrera
- Jalen Ngonda
- James Gist
- Jim Parsley
- Joe Bonomo
- Katherine and Sheila Lyon
- Kelli Hill
- Laurie Ann Haus
- Marat Akbarov
- Marina Pestova
- Marty Hurney
- Michael Parsons
- Robin Koontz
- Ron Weber
- Zach Hilton
