= List of public schools in Montgomery County, Maryland =

This is a list of public schools in Montgomery County. As of the 2022–2023 school year, the district had 11,763 teachers that served 160,489 students at 207 schools.

== Elementary schools ==
| School | Location | Students | Receiving School(s) | Cluster(s) |
|---|---|---|---|---|
| Arcola Elementary School | Silver Spring | 709 | Odessa Shannon | Downcounty Consortium |
| Ashburton Elementary School | Bethesda | 810 | North Bethesda | Walter Johnson |
| Bannockburn Elementary School | Bethesda | 418 | Pyle | Whitman |
| Lucy V. Barnsley Elementary School | Rockville | 657 | Wood | Rockville |
| Beall Elementary School | Rockville | 497 | Julius West | Richard Montgomery |
| Bel Pre Elementary School (K-2) | Silver Spring | 522 | Strathmore (3-5) | Downcounty Consortium |
| Bells Mill Elementary School | Potomac | 611 | Cabin John | Churchill |
| Belmont Elementary School | Olney | 344 | Rosa Parks | Sherwood |
| Bethesda Elementary School | Bethesda | 611 | Westland | Bethesda-Chevy Chase |
| Beverly Farms Elementary School | Potomac | 583 | Hoover | Churchill |
| Bradley Hills Elementary School | Bethesda | 464 | Pyle | Whitman |
| Brooke Grove Elementary School | Olney | 417 | Farquhar | Sherwood |
| Brookhaven Elementary School | Rockville | 410 | Argyle, Loiderman, Parkland | Downcounty Consortium |
| Brown Station Elementary School | Gaithersburg | 617 | Lakelands Park | Quince Orchard |
| Burning Tree Elementary School | Bethesda | 437 | Pyle | Whitman |
| Burnt Mills Elementary School | Silver Spring | 637 | Key | Northeast Consortium |
| Burtonsville Elementary School | Burtonsville | 617 | Banneker | Northeast Consortium |
| Candlewood Elementary School | Rockville | 368 | Shady Grove | Magruder |
| Cannon Road Elementary School | Silver Spring | 401 | Key | Northeast Consortium |
| Carderock Springs Elementary School | Bethesda | 337 | Pyle | Whitman |
| Rachel Carson Elementary School | Gaithersburg | 698 | Lakelands Park | Quince Orchard |
| Cashell Elementary School | Rockville | 336 | Redland | Magruder |
| Cedar Grove Elementary School | Germantown | 386 | Wells | Clarksburg, Damascus |
| Chevy Chase Elementary School (3-5) | Chevy Chase | 431 | Silver Creek | Bethesda-Chevy Chase |
| Clarksburg Elementary School | Clarksburg | 778 | Rocky Hill | Clarksburg |
| Clearspring Elementary School | Damascus | 574 | Baker | Damascus |
| Clopper Mill Elementary School | Germantown | 459 | Clemente | Northwest, Seneca Valley |
| Cloverly Elementary School | Silver Spring | 460 | Briggs Chaney, Farquhar | Northeast Consortium |
| Cold Spring Elementary School | Potomac | 351 | Cabin John | Wootton |
| College Gardens Elementary School | Rockville | 471 | Julius West | Richard Montgomery |
| Cresthaven Elementary School (3-5) | Silver Spring | 472 | Key | Northeast Consortium |
| Capt. James E. Daly Elementary School | Germantown | 515 | Rocky Hill | Clarksburg |
| Damascus Elementary School | Damascus | 366 | Baker | Damascus |
| Darnestown Elementary School | Gaithersburg | 340 | Lakelands Park | Northwest |
| Diamond Elementary School | Gaithersburg | 676 | Lakelands Park, Ridgeview | Northwest, Quince Orchard |
| Dr. Charles R. Drew Elementary School | Silver Spring | 476 | Key | Northeast Consortium |
| DuFief Elementary School | Gaithersburg | 245 | Frost | Wootton |
| East Silver Spring Elementary School | Silver Spring | 513 | Takoma Park MS | Downcounty Consortium |
| Fairland Elementary School | Silver Spring | 544 | Banneker, Briggs Chaney | Northeast Consortium |
| Fallsmead Elementary School | Rockville | 543 | Frost | Wootton |
| Farmland Elementary School | Rockville | 797 | Tilden | Walter Johnson |
| Fields Road Elementary School | Gaithersburg | 452 | Ridgeview | Quince Orchard |
| Flower Hill Elementary School | Gaithersburg | 460 | Shady Grove | Magruder |
| Flower Valley Elementary School | Rockville | 540 | Wood | Rockville |
| Forest Knolls Elementary School | Silver Spring | 494 | Silver Spring International | Downcounty Consortium |
| Fox Chapel Elementary School | Germantown | 593 | Rocky Hill | Clarksburg |
| Gaithersburg Elementary School | Gaithersburg | 717 | Gaithersburg MS | Gaithersburg |
| Galway Elementary School | Silver Spring | 733 | Briggs Chaney | Northeast Consortium |
| Garrett Park Elementary School | Kensington | 686 | Tilden | Walter Johnson |
| Georgian Forest Elementary School | Silver Spring | 519 | Argyle, Loiderman, Parkland | Downcounty Consortium |
| Germantown Elementary School | Germantown | 294 | Clemente | Northwest, Seneca Valley |
| William B. Gibbs, Jr. Elementary School | Germantown | 632 | Neelsville, Rocky Hill | Clarksburg, Seneca Valley |
| Glen Haven Elementary School | Silver Spring | 551 | Sligo | Downcounty Consortium |
| Glenallan Elementary School | Silver Spring | 656 | Odessa Shannon | Downcounty Consortium |
| Goshen Elementary School | Gaithersburg | 516 | Forest Oak | Gaithersburg |
| Great Seneca Creek Elementary School | Germantown | 520 | Kingsview | Northwest |
| Greencastle Elementary School | Silver Spring | 714 | Banneker | Northeast Consortium |
| Greenwood Elementary School | Brookeville | 539 | Rosa Parks | Sherwood |
| Harmony Hills Elementary School | Silver Spring | 699 | Argyle, Loiderman, Parkland | Downcounty Consortium |
| Highland Elementary School | Silver Spring | 515 | Newport Mill | Downcounty Consortium |
| Highland View Elementary School | Silver Spring | 382 | Silver Spring International | Downcounty Consortium |
| Jackson Road Elementary School | Silver Spring | 661 | White Oak | Northeast Consortium |
| Jones Lane Elementary School | Gaithersburg | 449 | Ridgeview | Quince Orchard |
| Kemp Mill Elementary School | Silver Spring | 422 | Odessa Shannon | Downcounty Consortium |
| Kensington Parkwood Elementary School | Kensington | 592 | North Bethesda | Walter Johnson |
| Lake Seneca Elementary School | Germantown | 459 | King | Seneca Valley |
| Lakewood Elementary School | Rockville | 438 | Frost | Wootton |
| Laytonsville Elementary School | Gaithersburg | 333 | Baker, Gaithersburg MS | Damascus, Gaithersburg |
| JoAnn Leleck Elementary School at Broad Acres | Silver Spring | 761 | White Oak | Northeast Consortium |
| Little Bennett Elementary School | Clarksburg | 631 | Rocky Hill | Clarksburg |
| Luxmanor Elementary School | Rockville | 707 | Tilden | Walter Johnson |
| Thurgood Marshall Elementary School | Gaithersburg | 591 | Ridgeview | Quince Orchard |
| Maryvale Elementary School | Rockville | 631 | Wood | Rockville |
| Spark M. Matsunaga Elementary School | Germantown | 567 | Kingsview, King | Northwest, Seneca Valley |
| S. Christa McAuliffe Elementary School | Germantown | 517 | Clemente | Seneca Valley |
| Dr. Ronald E. McNair Elementary School | Germantown | 729 | Kingsview | Northwest |
| Meadow Hall Elementary School | Rockville | 389 | Wood | Rockville |
| Mill Creek Towne Elementary School | Rockville | 468 | Shady Grove | Magruder |
| Monocacy Elementary School | Dickerson | 167 | John Poole | Poolesville |
| Montgomery Knolls Elementary School (K-2) | Silver Spring | 515 | Pine Crest (3-5) | Downcounty Consortium |
| New Hampshire Estates Elementary School (K-2) | Silver Spring | 434 | Oak View (3-5) | Downcounty Consortium |
| Roscoe R. Nix Elementary School (K-2) | Silver Spring | 473 | Cresthaven (3-5) | Northeast Consortium |
| North Chevy Chase Elementary School (3-5) | Chevy Chase | 234 | Silver Creek | Bethesda-Chevy Chase |
| Oak View Elementary School (3-5) | Silver Spring | 415 | Eastern | Downcounty Consortium |
| Oakland Terrace Elementary School | Silver Spring | 530 | Newport Mill | Downcounty Consortium |
| Olney Elementary School | Olney | 613 | Rosa Parks | Sherwood |
| William Tyler Page Elementary School | Silver Spring | 611 | Briggs Chaney | Northeast Consortium |
| Pine Crest Elementary School (3-5) | Silver Spring | 468 | Eastern | Downcounty Consortium |
| Piney Branch Elementary School (3-5) | Takoma Park | 599 | Takoma Park MS | Downcounty Consortium |
| Poolesville Elementary School | Poolesville | 567 | John Poole | Poolesville |
| Potomac Elementary School | Potomac | 443 | Hoover | Churchill |
| Judith A. Resnik Elementary School | Gaithersburg | 576 | Redland | Magruder |
| Dr. Sally K. Ride Elementary School | Germantown | 502 | Clemente, King | Seneca Valley |
| Ritchie Park Elementary School | Rockville | 378 | Julius West | Richard Montgomery |
| Rock Creek Forest Elementary School | Chevy Chase | 673 | Silver Creek, Westland | Bethesda-Chevy Chase |
| Rock Creek Valley Elementary School | Rockville | 385 | Wood | Rockville |
| Rock View Elementary School | Kensington | 600 | Newport Mill | Downcounty Consortium |
| Lois P. Rockwell Elementary School | Damascus | 514 | Baker | Damascus |
| Rolling Terrace Elementary School | Silver Spring | 709 | Silver Spring International | Downcounty Consortium |
| Rosemary Hills Elementary School (K-2) | Silver Spring | 578 | Chevy Chase (3-5), North Chevy Chase (3-5) | Bethesda-Chevy Chase |
| Rosemont Elementary School | Gaithersburg | 615 | Forest Oak | Gaithersburg |
| Bayard Rustin Elementary School | Rockville | 758 | Julius West | Richard Montgomery |
| Sequoyah Elementary School | Derwood | 431 | Redland | Magruder |
| Seven Locks Elementary School | Bethesda | 386 | Cabin John | Churchill |
| Sherwood Elementary School | Sandy Spring | 521 | Farquhar | Northeast Consortium, Sherwood |
| Sargent Shriver Elementary School | Silver Spring | 734 | Argyle, Loiderman, Parkland | Downcounty Consortium |
| Flora M. Singer Elementary School | Silver Spring | 634 | Sligo | Downcounty Consortium |
| Sligo Creek Elementary School | Silver Spring | 649 | Silver Spring International | Downcounty Consortium |
| Snowden Farm Elementary School | Clarksburg | 668 | Wells | Clarksburg, Damascus |
| Somerset Elementary School | Chevy Chase | 338 | Westland | Bethesda-Chevy Chase |
| South Lake Elementary School | Gaithersburg | 797 | Neelsville | Watkins Mill |
| Stedwick Elementary School | Gaithersburg | 501 | Montgomery Village, Neelsville | Watkins Mill |
| Stone Mill Elementary School | North Potomac | 550 | Cabin John | Wootton |
| Stonegate Elementary School | Silver Spring | 490 | Farquhar, White Oak | Northeast Consortium |
| Strathmore Elementary School (3-5) | Silver Spring | 487 | Argyle, Loiderman, Parkland | Downcounty Consortium |
| Strawberry Knoll Elementary School | Gaithersburg | 500 | Gaithersburg MS | Gaithersburg |
| Summit Hall Elementary School | Gaithersburg | 473 | Forest Oak | Gaithersburg |
| Takoma Park Elementary School (K-2) | Takoma Park | 579 | Piney Branch (3-5) | Downcounty Consortium |
| Travilah Elementary School | North Potomac | 377 | Frost | Wootton |
| Harriet R. Tubman Elementary School | Gaithersburg | 440 | Forest Oak | Gaithersburg |
| Twinbrook Elementary School | Rockville | 489 | Julius West | Richard Montgomery |
| Viers Mill Elementary School | Silver Spring | 520 | Argyle, Loiderman, Parkland | Downcounty Consortium |
| Washington Grove Elementary School | Gaithersburg | 434 | Gaithersburg MS | Gaithersburg |
| Waters Landing Elementary School | Germantown | 753 | King | Seneca Valley |
| Watkins Mill Elementary School | Montgomery Village | 735 | Montgomery Village | Watkins Mill |
| Wayside Elementary School | Potomac | 442 | Hoover | Churchill |
| Weller Road Elementary School | Silver Spring | 742 | Argyle, Loiderman, Parkland | Downcounty Consortium |
| Westbrook Elementary School | Bethesda | 496 | Westland | Bethesda-Chevy Chase |
| Westover Elementary School | Silver Spring | 289 | White Oak | Northeast Consortium |
| Wheaton Woods Elementary School | Rockville | 559 | Argyle, Loiderman, Parkland | Downcounty Consortium |
| Whetstone Elementary School | Gaithersburg | 715 | Montgomery Village | Watkins Mill |
| Wilson Wims Elementary School | Clarksburg | 563 | Wells | Clarksburg |
| Wood Acres Elementary School | Bethesda | 605 | Pyle | Whitman |
| Woodfield Elementary School | Gaithersburg | 323 | Baker | Damascus |
| Woodlin Elementary School | Silver Spring | 560 | Sligo | Downcounty Consortium |
| Wyngate Elementary School | Bethesda | 715 | North Bethesda | Walter Johnson |

== Middle schools ==
| School | Location | Students | Feeder schools |
|---|---|---|---|
| Argyle Middle School | Silver Spring | 995 | Bel Pre, Brookhaven, Georgian Forest, Harmony Hills, Shriver, Strathmore, Viers Mill, Weller Road, Wheaton Woods |
| John T. Baker Middle School | Damascus | 825 | Clearspring, Damascus, Laytonsville, Rockwell, Woodfield |
| Benjamin Banneker Middle School | Burtonsville | 781 | Burtonsville, Fairland, Greencastle |
| Briggs Chaney Middle School | Silver Spring | 864 | Cloverly, Fairland, Galway, Page |
| Cabin John Middle School | Potomac | 974 | Bells Mill, Cold Spring, Seven Locks, Stone Mill |
| Roberto W. Clemente Middle School | Germantown | 857 | Clopper Mill, Germantown, Great Seneca Creek, McAuliffe, Ride |
| Eastern Middle School | Silver Spring | 893 | Montgomery Knolls, New Hampshire Estates, Oak View, Pine Crest |
| William H. Farquhar Middle School | Olney | 674 | Brooke Grove, Cloverly, Sherwood, Stonegate |
| Forest Oak Middle School | Gaithersburg | 922 | Goshen, Rosemont, Summit Hall, Harriet R. Tubman |
| Robert Frost Middle School | Rockville | 968 | DuFief, Fallsmead, Lakewood, Travilah |
| Gaithersburg Middle School | Gaithersburg | 875 | Gaithersburg, Laytonsville, Strawberry Knoll, Washington Grove |
| Hallie Wells Middle School | Clarksburg | 963 | Cedar Grove, Snowden Farm, Wilson Wims |
| Herbert Hoover Middle School | Potomac | 925 | Beverly Farms, Potomac, Wayside |
| Francis Scott Key Middle School | Silver Spring | 965 | Burnt Mills, Cannon Road, Cresthaven, Drew, Nix |
| Dr. Martin Luther King, Jr. Middle School | Germantown | 890 | Lake Seneca, Matsunaga, Dr. Sally K. Ride, Waters Landing |
| Kingsview Middle School | Germantown | 960 | Great Seneca Creek, Matsunaga, McNair |
| Lakelands Park Middle School | Gaithersburg | 1,042 | Brown Station, Rachel Carson, Darnestown, Diamond |
| A. Mario Loiederman Middle School | Silver Spring | 1,001 | Bel Pre, Brookhaven, Georgian Forest, Harmony Hills, Shriver, Strathmore, Viers Mill, Weller Road, Wheaton Woods |
| Montgomery Village Middle School | Montgomery Village | 773 | Stedwick, Watkins Mill, Whetstone |
| Neelsville Middle School | Germantown | 815 | Cabin Branch, Gibbs, South Lake, Stedwick |
| Newport Mill Middle School | Kensington | 623 | Highland, Oakland Terrace, Rock View |
| North Bethesda Middle School | Bethesda | 1,110 | Ashburton, Kensington Parkwood, Wyngate |
| Parkland Middle School | Rockville | 1,050 | Bel Pre, Brookhaven, Georgian Forest, Harmony Hills, Shriver, Strathmore, Viers Mill, Weller Road, Wheaton Woods |
| Rosa M. Parks Middle School | Olney | 848 | Belmont, Greenwood, Olney |
| John Poole Middle School | Poolesville | 443 | Monocacy, Poolesville |
| Thomas W. Pyle Middle School | Bethesda | 1,241 | Bannockburn, Bradley Hills, Burning Tree, Carderock Springs, Wood Acres |
| Redland Middle School | Rockville | 571 | Cashell, Resnik, Sequoyah |
| Ridgeview Middle School | Gaithersburg | 751 | Diamond, Fields Road, Marshall, Jones Lane |
| Rocky Hill Middle School | Clarksburg | 1,058 | Clarksburg, Daly, Fox Chapel, Gibbs, Little Bennett |
| Shady Grove Middle School | Gaithersburg | 495 | Candlewood, Flower Hill, Mill Creek Towne |
| Odessa Shannon Middle School (previously Col. E. Brooke Lee Middle School) | Wheaton, Silver Spring | 823 | Arcola, Glenallan, Kemp Mill |
| Silver Creek Middle School | Kensington | 778 | Chevy Chase, North Chevy Chase, Rock Creek Forest, Rosemary Hills |
| Silver Spring International Middle School | Silver Spring | 1,158 | Forest Knolls, Highland View, Sligo Creek, Rolling Terrace |
| Sligo Middle School | Silver Spring | 676 | Glen Haven, Flora Singer, Woodlin |
| Takoma Park Middle School | Silver Spring | 1,077 | East Silver Spring, Piney Branch, Takoma Park |
| Tilden Middle School | Rockville | 1,100 | Farmland, Garrett Park, Luxmanor |
| Julius West Middle School | Rockville | 1,325 | Beall, College Gardens, Ritchie Park, Rustin, Twinbrook |
| Westland Middle School | Bethesda | 845 | Bethesda, Rock Creek Forest (Spanish immersion), Somerset, Westbrook |
| White Oak Middle School | Silver Spring | 852 | JoAnn Lelack, Jackson Road, Stonegate, Westover |
| Earle B. Wood Middle School | Rockville | 1,068 | Barnsley, Flower Valley, Maryvale, Meadow Hall, Rock Creek Valley |

== High schools ==
| School | Location | Students | Feeder schools |
|---|---|---|---|
| Bethesda-Chevy Chase High School | Bethesda | 2,335 | Silver Creek, Westland |
| Montgomery Blair High School | Silver Spring | 3,204 | Argyle, Eastern, Loiederman, Newport Mill, Odessa Shannon, Parkland, Sligo, Silver Spring Int'l, Takoma Park MS |
| James Hubert Blake High School | Silver Spring | 1,784 | Banneker, Briggs Chaney, Farquhar, Key, White Oak |
| Winston Churchill High School | Potomac | 2,234 | Cabin John, Hoover |
| Clarksburg High School | Clarksburg | 2,251 | Rocky Hill, Wells |
| Damascus High School | Damascus | 1,414 | Baker, Wells |
| Thomas Edison High School of Technology | Silver Spring | 558 | — |
| Albert Einstein High School | Kensington | 2,012 | Argyle, Eastern, Loiederman, Newport Mill, Odessa Shannon, Parkland, Sligo, Silver Spring Int'l, Takoma Park MS |
| Gaithersburg High School | Gaithersburg | 2,436 | Forest Oak, Gaithersburg |
| Walter Johnson High School | North Bethesda | 2,942 | North Bethesda, Tilden |
| John F. Kennedy High School | Silver Spring | 1,827 | Argyle, Eastern, Loiederman, Newport Mill, Odessa Shannon, Parkland, Sligo, Silver Spring Int'l, Takoma Park MS |
| Col. Zadok A. Magruder High School | Rockville | 1,686 | Redland, Shady Grove |
| Richard Montgomery High School | Rockville | 2,390 | Julius West |
| Northwest High School | Germantown | 2,484 | Clemente, Kingsview, Lakelands Park |
| Northwood High School | Silver Spring | 1,796 | Argyle, Eastern, Loiederman, Newport Mill, Odessa Shannon, Parkland, Sligo, Silver Spring Int'l, Takoma Park MS |
| Paint Branch High School | Burtonsville | 2,135 | Banneker, Briggs Chaney, Farquhar, Key, White Oak |
| Poolesville High School | Poolesville | 1,309 | John Poole |
| Quince Orchard High School | Gaithersburg | 2,154 | Lakelands Park, Ridgeview |
| Rockville High School | Rockville | 1,516 | Wood |
| Seneca Valley High School | Germantown | 2,239 | Clemente, King, Neelsville |
| Sherwood High School | Sandy Spring | 1,721 | Farquhar, Rosa Parks |
| Springbrook High School | Silver Spring | 1,838 | Banneker, Briggs Chaney, Farquhar, Key, White Oak |
| Watkins Mill High School | Gaithersburg | 1,715 | Montgomery Village, Neelsville |
| Wheaton High School | Silver Spring | 2,599 | Argyle, Eastern, Loiederman, Newport Mill, Odessa Shannon, Parkland, Sligo, Silver Spring Int'l, Takoma Park MS |
| Walt Whitman High School | Bethesda | 2,018 | Pyle |
| Thomas S. Wootton High School | North Potomac | 1,911 | Cabin John, Frost |

=== Sources (for all schools) ===
- Enrollment: MCPS Schools at a Glance 2022-23
- Articulation Patterns: Recommended Actions and Planning Issues

== Special schools ==
- Outdoor Education Team
- Caithness Shelter Home
- Emory Grove Center
- Fleet Street
- Glenmont
- Hadley Farms
- Karma Academy
- Kingsley Wilderness Project
- Phoenix at Emory Grove Center
- Randolph Academy
- Stephen Knolls School
- Longview School
- RICA - John L. Gildner Regional Institute for Children and Adolescents
- Rock Terrace School
- Carl Sandburg Learning Center

== Magnet schools ==
Magnet schools are schools that have a specialization, such as; IT, the arts, and engineering. The curriculum is harder and teaches work that is above grade level.

- Parkland Magnet Middle School
- Silver Spring International Middle School
- Argyle Magnet Middle School
- Loiederman Magnet Middle School
- Albert Einstein High School
- Montgomery Blair High School
- Wheaton High School
- Northwood High School
- Poolesville High School
- Richard Montgomery High School

== See also ==
- Montgomery County Public Schools
