= Newport Mill Middle School =

Public school in Maryland

- Architect's sketch, 1957

Location
- 11311 Newport Mill Road, Kensington, Maryland 20895
- Coordinates: 39.0415050°N 77.0677950°W

Information
- Type: Public Middle School
- Established: 1958
- School district: Montgomery County Public Schools
- Grades: 6–8
- Enrollment: 670
- Student to teacher ratio: 8.0
- Hours in school day: 6.75
- Campus size: 8.4 acres (3 ha)
- Area: 108,240 square feet (10,056 m^{2})
- Colors: Orange and Blue
- Mascot: Tigers
- Website: www.montgomeryschoolsmd.org/schools/newportmillms/

Newport Mill Middle School is a public school for students in grades 6, 7, and 8, located in Kensington, Maryland.

Newport Mill Middle School's students generally live in Kensington, Wheaton, and Silver Spring

Students who graduate from Rock View, Oakland Terrace, or Highland elementary schools may attend Newport Mill Middle School. Graduates of Newport Mill Middle School may attend Blair, Einstein, Kennedy, Northwood, or Wheaton high schools. Some may even go on to attend high schools outside of the DCC, like Richard Montgomery High School, or Clarksburg High School.

== Student body ==
During the 2015–2016 school year, Newport Mill Middle School had 186 sixth graders, 196 seventh graders, and 205 eighth graders. The school's capacity is 825, while its total enrollment is 587. Of Newport Mill Middle School's students, 48 percent were Hispanic/Latino, 17 percent are Black/African American, 20 percent are White, 11 percent are Asian American, and 4 percent are multiracial.

== Awards ==
In 2006, Principal Nelson McLeod received a Distinguished Educational Leadership Award from The Washington Post. During that school year, 67 percent of black students were proficient in math, which was almost double the percentage three years before. Of eighth graders who were black, 68 percent were enrolled in high school-level math, compared with 44 percent in Montgomery County Public Schools overall. Of the student body overall, 71 percent were proficient in math, up from 50 percent two years prior. The award was in recognition of Principal McLeod's hands-on efforts and leadership that spurred the students' achievements.

In 2007, Newport Mill Middle School was one of ten schools nationwide that was recognized as a National School of Character by the Character Education Partnership. Newport Mill Middle School received the award because of its success and diversity. They had started an International Baccalaureate Middle Years Program, which focused on international understanding and critical thinking. Newport Mill Middle School was also commended for its Parent Place program, which provided workshops for parents in English and Spanish. Principal McLeod had made sure to ask for suggestions from students, parents, and teachers on how to increase respect, responsibility, caring, sportsmanship and effort. The award included a $20,000 grant for the school.

In 2017, Newport Mill Middle School was one of three schools in Maryland selected for the National Foundation for Governor’s Fitness Councils DON’T QUIT Award for demonstrating new and innovative ways of promoting student physical activity and wellness. As a recipient of the award, Newport Mill was gifted a $100,000 state-of-the-art fitness center. Jake Steinfeld, Chairman of the National Foundation for Governors’ Fitness Councils, Governor Larry Hogan, and other state and county officials visited Newport Mill for the ribbon-cutting ceremony.

In 2018, Newport Mill Middle School was recognized as one of 46 schools in the nation to receive the U.S. Department of Education's Green Ribbon Schools designation. The award recognizes schools for trying to save energy, fostering health and wellness, teaching students about the environment, and creating sustainable learning spaces.

== Facility ==
Newport Mill Middle School sits on a campus of 8.4 acres (3 ha). The school building is 108,240 square feet (10,056 m^{2}). The building has a capacity of 825.

Five school bus routes serve the students.

== History ==
=== Opening ===
Some of the surrounding neighborhood was built in 1950; other parts were built in 1956. Montgomery County Public Schools and the Maryland-National Capital Park and Planning Commission bought 20 acres (8 ha) of land in 1955 in order to build a junior high school and a recreation center.

Construction of the school began in June 1957. The architecture firm of Justement, Elam and Darby designed the building. The architects wanted to design a large school with an efficient layout and many large windows. The architects said that 90 percent of the school's exterior was covered by glass windows. The cafeteria and gymnasium were built near the street in order reduce the amount of street noise that would enter its classrooms. The construction budget was $1.7 million.

The school opened in September 1958 with the name Newport Mill Junior High School. The school was named after a gristmill named Newport Mill that had been built nearby in 1756. The gristmill had been used to grind flour for American soldiers during the American Revolutionary War.

Romaine Robinson was the school's first vice principal. Robinson had been the vice principal of Lincoln Junior High School in Rockville until it closed. Robinson was black, and the school's student body was predominantly white. At the time, she was one of two individuals in the county school who were black in a leadership position at a school with predominantly white students. The Montgomery County Board of Education appointed Robinson vice principal as part of its efforts toward racial integration.

=== Closure ===
The building operated as a public school until 1982 when it was closed due to declining enrollment. The building was leased to a private school that had formerly been operating under the name Town and Country Day School in Kensington. The private school changed its name to the Newport School when it moved to Newport Mill Junior High School's building.

=== Renovation and reopening ===
When Sligo Middle School's enrollment exceeded its capacity, the Montgomery County Board of Education decided to renovate and reopen it as a public school for the 2002–2003 school year. The Montgomery County Board of Education considered changing the school's name to either A. Mario Loiederman Middle School, for a community activist originally from South America which was later named for the then-closed Col. Joseph A. Belt Junior High School when it reopened in the 2005–2006 school year, or J.D. Speller Middle School, for the African American founder of a middle school honors math and science society. Residents of the surrounding neighborhood asked the Montgomery County Board of Education to keep Newport Mill in the school's name, because the school had been known by that name for many years. The school was reopened with the name Newport Mill Middle School in 2002.
