= Mateen Ibirogba =

American football player (born 2004)

Texas Tech Red Raiders
- Position: Defensive tackle
- Class: Redshirt Junior

Personal information
- Born: March 19, 2004 (age 22)
- Listed height: 6 ft 3 in (1.91 m)
- Listed weight: 296 lb (134 kg)

Career information
- High school: Clarksburg (Clarksburg, Maryland)
- College: Georgetown (2022–2023); Wake Forest (2024–2025); Texas Tech (2026–present)
- Stats at ESPN

Mateen Ibirogba (born March 19, 2004) is an American football defensive tackle for the Texas Tech Red Raiders. He previously played for the Georgetown Hoyas and the Wake Forest Demon Deacons.

== Early life ==
Ibirogba attended Clarksburg High School located in Clarksburg, Maryland. He committed to play college football for the Georgetown Hoyas.

== College career ==
In two seasons at Georgetown from 2022 to 2023, Ibirogba recorded 51 tackles with 11.5 going for a loss, and four and a half sacks. After the 2023 season, he entered the NCAA transfer portal.

Ibirogba transferred to play for the Wake Forest Demon Deacons. In 2024, he played in four games and was redshirted. In 2025, Ibirogba notched 21 tackles with three and a half for loss, two sacks, a pass deflection, and a forced fumble. After the season he once again entered the transfer portal.

Ibirogba transferred to play for the Texas Tech Red Raiders. He entered the 2026 season as a starter on the Red Raider defensive line. In week 7 of the 2026 season, Ibirogba notched a sack in a win over Colorado.
