= John F. Kennedy High School (Maryland) =

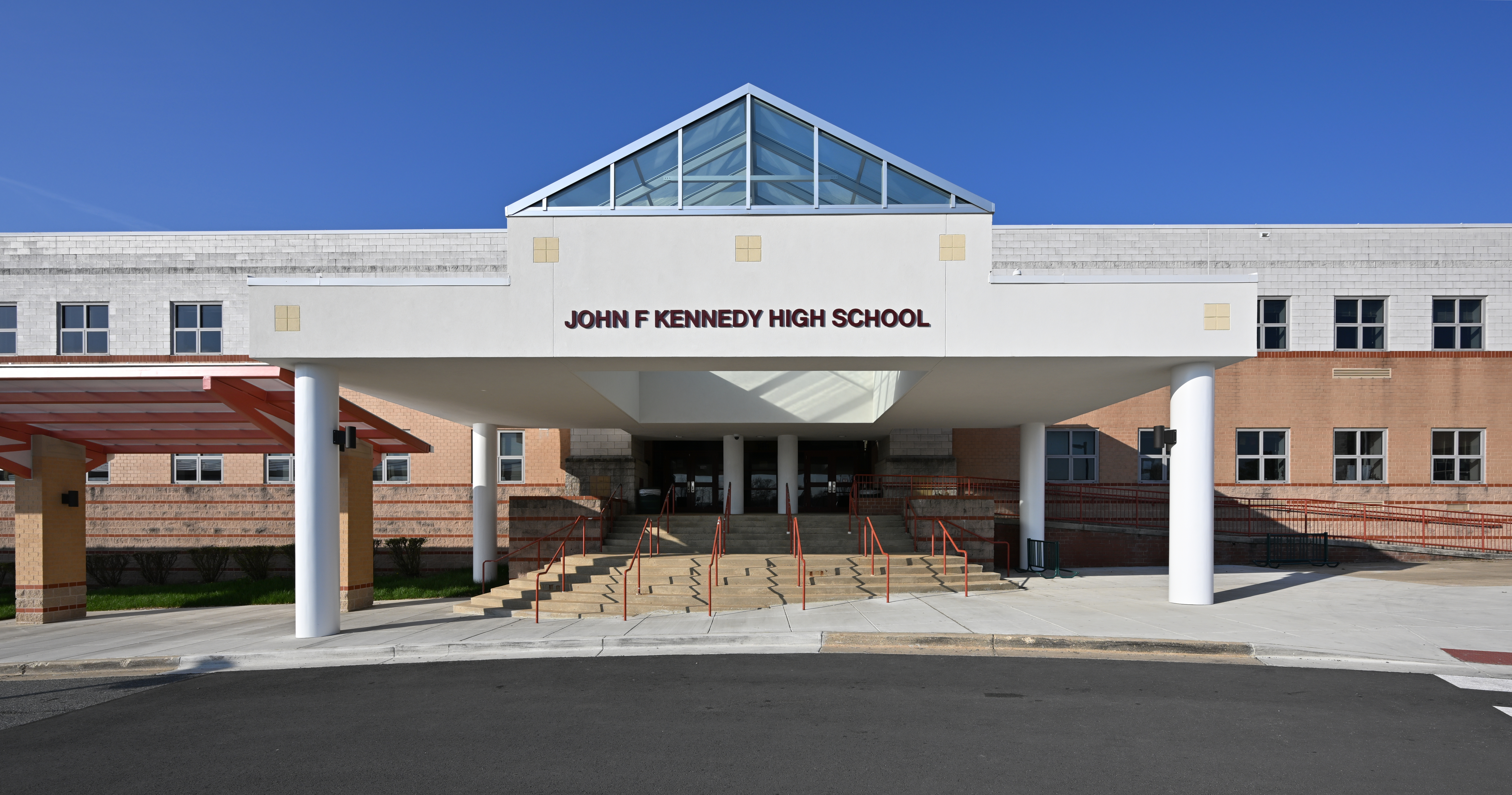

Location
- 1901 Randolph Road; Silver Spring, Maryland 20902; United States; 39.0658°N 77.0389°W

Information
- Type: Public Secondary
- Established: 1964; 62 years ago
- School district: Montgomery County Public Schools
- Principal: Karla L Lopez-Arias
- Assistant Principals: Vaughn Bradley, Charles (Matt) Chandler, Elizabeth Joachim, Elizabeth Rodgers
- Teaching staff: 135 FTE (2022–2023)
- Grades: 9–12
- Gender: Coeducational
- Enrollment: 1,827 (2022–2023)
- Student to teacher ratio: 10.6:1 (2022–2023)
- Campus: Suburban
- Campus size: 29.1 acres (12 ha)
- Colors: Kelly green and Vegas gold
- Mascot: Cavalier
- Rival: Wheaton High School
- USNWR ranking: 9,765
- Yearbook: The Legacy
- Website: www.montgomeryschoolsmd.org/schools/kennedyhs/

John F. Kennedy High School is a public high school located in Glenmont, Maryland, United States. It is part of the Montgomery County Public Schools system.

Kennedy is a member of the Downcounty Consortium along with nearby Montgomery Blair, Wheaton, Albert Einstein, and Northwood High Schools. Kennedy's feeder schools are Argyle Middle School, Eastern Middle School, A. Mario Loiederman Middle School, Newport Mill Middle School, Parkland Middle School, Sligo Middle School, Odessa Shannon Middle School, Silver Spring International Middle School, and Takoma Park Middle School. Students from any of those high schools' base areas can apply to attend Kennedy through a lottery process, after students from Kennedy's own base middle schools—Odessa Shannon and Argyle—are offered spots.

The school mascot is the Cavalier.

== History ==
John F. Kennedy High School was founded in 1964 It was originally intended to be called East Wheaton High School, but following the assassination of President John F. Kennedy on November 22, 1963, the school was renamed after him. It initially enrolled students in 7th through 10th grades. But in fall 1966, the school was changed to serve students in 10th through 12th grades. Its first full 12th grade class graduate in 1967.

In 1981, following changes to the Montgomery County Public School's junior high school structure, which changed from 7th to 9th grade to 6th to 8th grades and became a middle school structure, 9th grade students began attending the school. It has since served students in 9th through 12th grades.

Kennedy's early history is that of an experimental, innovative school, with no school bells, broad lesson plans, innovative class subjects, pass-fail grading, an eight-period day with one free period during the day, and optional attendance in some classes. In September 1971, Bruce Sivertsen became the new principal, and Superintendent Homer O. Elseroad instructed Principal Sivertsen to increase structure, end free periods, and mandate the taking of attendance in classes. Two months later, students circulated a petition to allow students to be present in the building when not in class, open unused classrooms for student use, allow student input in the curriculum, biweekly assemblies with the principal to discuss problems, and hiring of teachers by departments. Students said that the principal's changes had changed the nature of the school, from open and friendly to tense. In April 1972, the Montgomery County school board voted to adopt a policy that allows innovative methods and programs only with the support of parents and teachers. The policy did not require a formal survey of parents' and teachers' opinions though.

In 1984, about 100 students and parents met with Principal Robert Hacker to complain about an ongoing pattern of racial discrimination at Kennedy. They said that certain staff members would disproportionately discipline black students compared to white students. They criticized racist caricatures of black individuals printed in the school's newspaper. During a basketball game between Kennedy and Northwood High School, Hecker requested police presence due to rumors of fights. When the police chased students with dogs, threw students against walls, and frisked students, Principal Hacker did not object at the time and said the police department was responsible.

In 1985, Northwood High School in Kemp Mill was closed due to declining enrollment, and its students were transferred to Kennedy. When Kennedy's building was renovated between 1997 and 1999, its students attended classes in Northwood's building during those years. In 2004, Northwood reopened to students after student enrollment increased again.

== Demographics ==
Of Kennedy's student body for the 2025–2026 school year, 22% was African American, 5% was Asian American, 67% was Hispanic, 5% was Non-Hispanic White, and 1% was of two or more races.

== Academics ==
Kennedy offers the International Baccalaureate diploma, which about 13% of students take. There are also five academy programs designed to attract students from across the Downcounty Consortium: the Leadership Training Institute (LTI), broadcast journalism, business management, health professions such as the CCMA degree and biotechnology, as well as Navy Junior ROTC. Kennedy additionally offers over 15 Advanced Placement courses for students to earn college credit—ranging from Studio Art to World History -- which 34% of students take. During the 2019–2020 school year, 28% of its graduating class scored a 3 or better on an Advanced Placement test or 4 or better on an Baccalaureate test. On the SAT, the school average was 883 for the 2022–2023 school year. Around 89% of its graduating class enroll in two- and four-year colleges and universities. Like all other Montgomery County high schools, at least 75 hours of community service are required for graduation.

U.S. News & World Report ranks Kennedy the 149th-best school in Maryland.

== Athletics ==
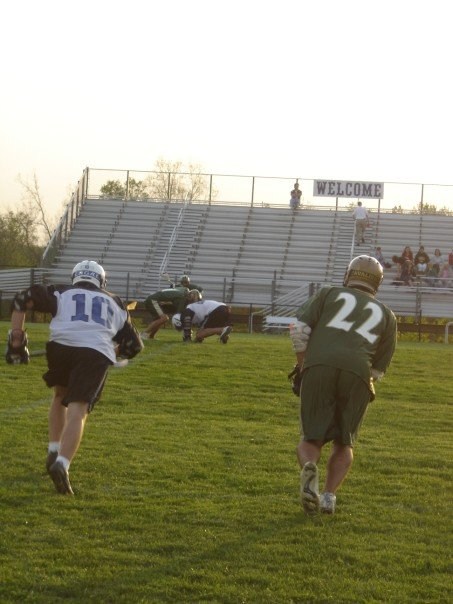
Kennedy vs. Blake in 2007

All tournaments and finals are conducted by the Maryland Public Secondary Schools Athletic Association (MPSSAA).

=== Championships ===
==== Basketball ====
- Boys Division Championships: 1989, 1997, 2004
- Boys Regional Championships: 1989, 1996, 2004
- Girls Division Championship: 2006

==== Cheerleading ====
- State Championships: 1999, 2000, 2007

==== Cross Country ====
- Boys State Championship: 1974 (Class A; 64; Coach Al Bellman)
- Girls State Championship: 1983 (Class A; 67; Coach Al Bellman)
- Girls Division Championships: 1983, 1984, 1987, 1988
- Girls Regional Championships: 1983, 1984
- Girls County Championships: 1999; 2000
- Girls County Division Championships: 1999, 2000, 2002, 2008

==== Field Hockey ====
- State Championship: 1981 (5–0; Coach Barbara Belt)
- State Semifinalist: 1980, 1982

==== Football ====
- State Championships: 1977 (Class C; 13–0; Coach Wesley Abrams), 1984 (Class A; 18–15; Coach Brady Straub)
- Division Championships: 1984, 1990
- Regional Championship: 1984

==== Indoor Track ====
- Boys Regional Championship: 1979
- Boys County Championship: 1986
- Girls Regional Championships: 1985, 1986, 1987, 1988, 1989
- Girls County Championships: 1986, 1989

==== Soccer ====
- Boys State Championships: 1978 (Class B vs. Oakland Mills; Coach Gene Hostetler), 1989 (Class 3A; tied 2–2 vs. Howard {then #1 ranked team by USA Today}; Coach Jeff Schultz)
- Boys State Finalist: 1980, 1985
- Boys Regional Championships: 1979, 1980, 1985, 1987
- Boys Division Championship: 2010
- Girls Division Championships: 1997, 2009

==== Swim and Dive ====
- Boys Division Championships: 2005, 2007
- Girls Division Championships: 2007

==== Tennis ====
- Boys Division Champions: 1980, 1988, 1989, 1999, 2000, 2005, 2017
- Girls Division Championships: 1993, 2002

==== Track and Field ====
- Girls Division Championships: 1983, 1984, 1986, 1987, 1988, 1989
- Boys Division Championships: 1984, 1988, 1989, 1993, 2002
- Boys Finalist: 1967

==== Wrestling ====
- 1973 and 1974 Maryland State Champion - Kelly Ward
- 1974 Maryland State Champion - Mark Watson
- 1974 3rd Place Team - Maryland State Tournament
- 1988 Montgomery County Individual Champion Shawn Dykes (189 lbs)

=== Athletic rivalries ===
Kennedy's primary rival is Wheaton High School, due to the schools' close proximity to one another.

Other smaller rivalries include those with Albert Einstein High School and for lacrosse Rockville High School.

== Facilities ==
Kennedy's Football stadium is named in memory of Brady Straub, who coached the 1984 football team to the state championship. The following year, he bravely led the team while battling cancer, succumbing shortly after the end of the season. The field was redone in the spring of 2007 after being condemned by the county for poor conditions.

The gymnasium hallway bears the last name of former Kennedy all-star basketball player and captain Jeremy Herring. Herring, who was the lead scorer for Montgomery County in 2007, was slain along with his brother Justin Herring (also an alumni) in the summer following his graduation.

== Notable alumni ==
- Charles Arndt, American Professional Soccer League goalkeeper for the Maryland Bays
- Rachel Chavkin, Broadway director
- Burrell Ellis, member of the Board of Commissioners of DeKalb County, Georgia; former chief executive officer of DeKalb County
- Vencie Glenn, National Football League defensive back
- Humayun Khan, American soldier
- Allison Krause, a student at Kent State University, killed by the Ohio Army National Guard at a campus protest; a tree was planted at Kennedy in her memory
- Thea LaFond, Olympic triple jumper
- Erik McMillan, All-Pro NFL defensive back
- Robert Mugge, American documentary filmmaker
- Curtis Pride, Major League Baseball outfielder, head baseball coach at Gallaudet University
- David Silverman director and producer on the show The Simpsons
- Lori Stokes, television broadcast journalist

== Notable faculty ==
- Thea LaFond, Olympic triple jumper

== See also ==
- List of memorials to John F. Kennedy
