= Einstein High School =

Einstein High School could refer to

- Einstein High School in the Los Angeles Unified School District
- Albert Einstein High School in Montgomery County, Maryland
