= Diamond Elementary School =

Diamond Elementary School may refer to:

- Diamond Elementary School, in the Santa Ana Unified School District elementary schools, in Santa Ana, California
- Diamond Elementary School, a public elementary school in Liberty County, Georgia, in Fort Stewart, Georgia
- Diamond Elementary School, a public elementary school in Montgomery County, Maryland, in Gaithersburg, Maryland
