= Jon Routson =

American artist (born 1969)

- Born: 1969 (age 55–56); Washington, D.C., U.S.
- Education: Albert Einstein High School; Maryland Institute College of Art; University of Maryland, College Park; University of Maryland, Baltimore County (MFA)
- Occupation: Artist
- Style: Video, new media, and conceptual

Jon Routson (born 1969 in Washington, D.C.) is an American artist working in video, new media, and conceptual art. He is based in Baltimore, Maryland.

== Education ==
Routson attended Albert Einstein High School in Kensington, Maryland. After briefly attending the Maryland Institute College of Art, he received a bachelor's degree from University of Maryland, College Park in 1993. Routson went on to earn his MFA from the University of Maryland Baltimore County in 2003. In between his degrees, Routson worked as an artist assistant under painter Marilyn Minter and video artist Vito Acconci in New York.

== Career ==
Routson briefly taught at the Corcoran College of Art and Design.

=== Work ===
Routson is primarily known for his video work, particularly his use of bootleg recording. Between 1999 and 2004, Routson made numerous recordings of contemporaneous Hollywood films using a handheld video camera inside a movie theater. Routson would balance the camera somewhere on his person and intentionally not look through the viewfinder. The videos often ended up largely obscuring the movie screen, either by angle or silhouette. For instance, Routson's recording of The Passion of the Christ blocked the movie's subtitles behind the back of a theatre seat. While such recordings, known as camrips, are commonly uploaded on peer-to-peer file sharing sites, Routson's works were projected on the wall of art galleries. Routson showed numerous bootlegs in two shows at the Team Gallery in New York City in 2003 and 2004. Routson also created an edit of Matthew Barney's Cremaster 4. Routson cut a VHS recording of Barney's film down to a television standard 22 minutes, added television commercials, credits, and an ABC television watermark logo. The work was intended to emulate the ABC program Saturday Night Movie.

Routson's work has faced legal complications. On October 1, 2004, Maryland ruled the unauthorized use of recording equipment inside a movie theater illegal. Routson accordingly stopped his bootlegging practice in 2004.

Other of Routson's projects include a photography series in which he takes or purchases photographs of shopping-mall Easter bunnies sitting or standing by themselves, and the 2003 work My Guitar in which Routson displayed his Fender guitar along with a "For Sale" flyer.

Reception of Routson's work has been mixed. One critic praises his Bootlegs, claiming the works give "urgency and pleasure to questions about art in the age of mechanical reproduction, long after the low-tech avant-garde had turned them into truisms." Another, however, describes his appropriation work as "lazy" and "vampiric".

=== Exhibition and representation ===
Routson is represented by the Team Gallery in New York City. Below is a list of selected solo and group exhibitions.

=== 2009 ===
Team Gallery, New York, NY, Arcangel, Pinard, Routson

=== 2007 ===
Current Gallery, Baltimore, MD, feel this dead vibration

=== 2004 ===
Team Gallery, New York, NY, recordings II

=== 2003 ===
Team Gallery, New York, NY, recordings

White Columns, New York, NY, Mama’s Boy

=== 2002 ===
MoCA-D.C., Washington, D.C., Jon Routson

Flat, New York, NY, Episode II

=== 2001 ===
Team, Project Room, New York, Carrie/Porky's: Originality, Neatness, and Hygiene

=== 1999 ===
CRP Gallery, Brooklyn, NY and thing.net, Jon Routson's Bootleg

=== 1992 ===
Dooley LeCappelaine Gallery, New York, NY, Free Kittens
