= Thomas Edison High School of Technology =

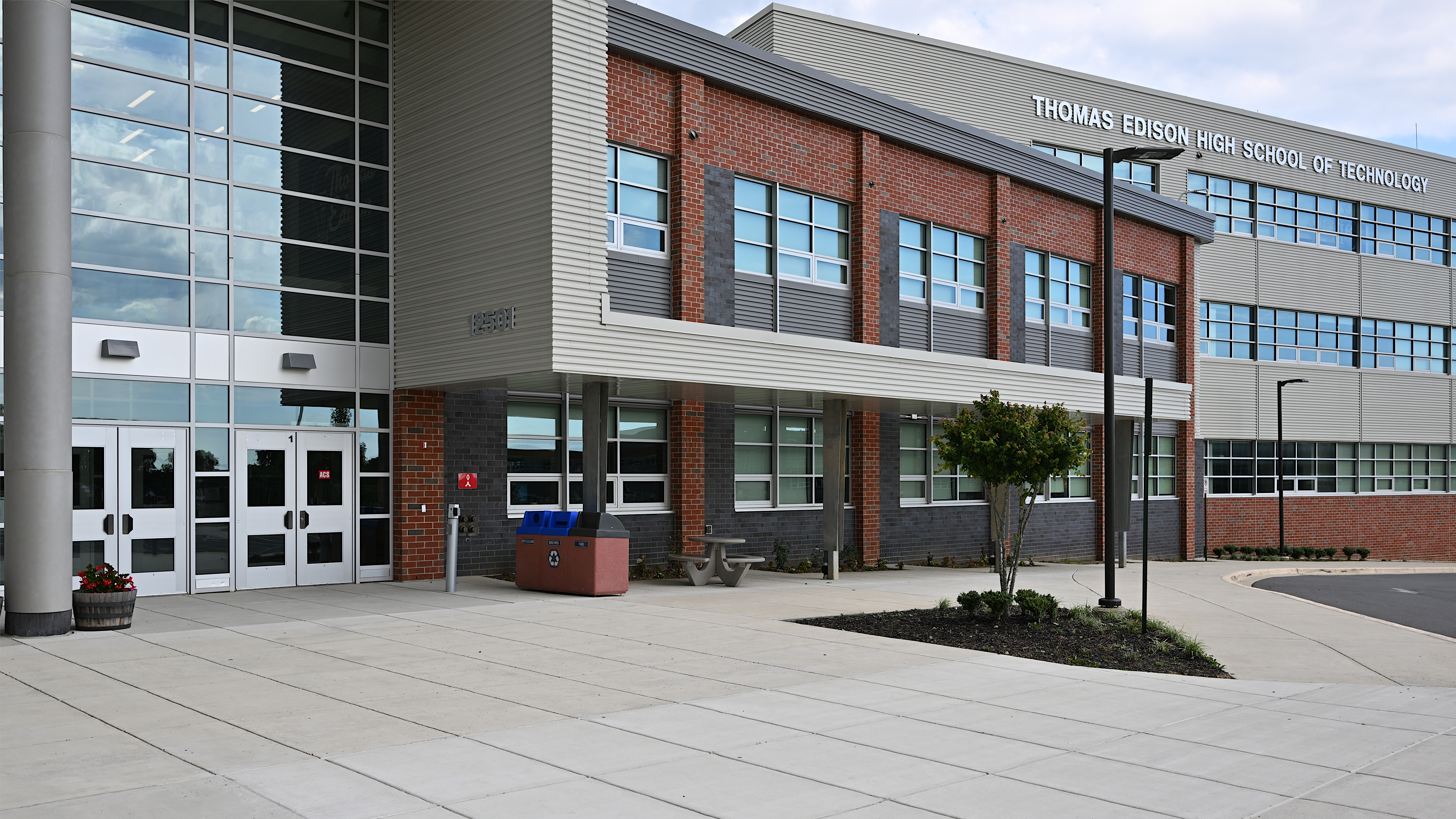

Location
- 12501 Dalewood Dr. Silver Spring, Maryland; United States; 39°3′39″N 77°4′4″W

Information
- Type: Public secondary vocational
- Motto: Experience Success
- Established: 1981
- School district: Montgomery County Public Schools
- Principal: Michael Warner
- Grades: 10–12
- Enrollment: 558 (2021-2022)
- Campus: Suburban
- Website: Thomas Edison

Thomas Edison High School of Technology (often referred to as Thomas Edison or Edison) is a public vocational/technical high school in Wheaton, an unincorporated section of Montgomery County, Maryland, next to Wheaton High School.

Edison is a member of the Downcounty Consortium. Its programs consist of an academic base, industry competency requirements, employability skill development and career/college planning components, as well as opportunities for leadership development. Thomas Edison registers all students in SkillsUSA, a career and technical student organization.

Typically, students spend half of their day at Thomas Edison, and the other half at their neighborhood school. Thomas Edison offers two sessions: the morning session from 7:55 to 10:15, and the afternoon session from 11:20 a.m. to 1:50 p.m.

Thomas Edison is also the headquarters for the Montgomery County Students Trades Foundations Office.

== Programs ==
Thomas Edison offers 19 programs that take one, two or three years to complete.

=== One-year programs ===
- Cybersecurity
- Foundations of Building Construction Technology (FBCT)
- Hospitality and Tourism Management Program (HTMP)
- Law Enforcement and Leadership
- Medical Careers
- Network Operations
- Restaurant Management / Culinary Arts

=== Two-year programs ===
- Academy of Health Professions
- Automotive Body Repair Technology
- Automotive Technology & Dealership Training
- Carpentry
- Construction Electricity
- Graphic design
- Heating, Ventilation, & Air Conditioning
- Masonry
- Plumbing
- Principles of Architecture & CAD Technology
- Print Technologies & Digital Graphics

=== Three-year programs ===
- Cosmetology

=== Wheaton-Edison Partnership Programs ===
Students in Wheaton High School academy can (if won the lottery) take courses at Edison that are similar to what they are learning in their academy.

- Construction Management & Architecture (Engineering Academy)
- Healthcare Professions (Bioscience Academy)
- Hospitality and Tourism Management (Global Studies Academy)
- Information Technology and Cybersecurity (Academy of Information Technology)

== Student body ==
For the 2021–2022 school year, Thomas Edison has a total of 558 enrolled students, 62.2% male and 37.8% female. The student body is 52.9% Hispanic, 22.4% African American, 17.0% White, 5.4% Asian, and 5.0% or less in each of the following: American Indian or Alaskan Native; Native Hawaiian or Other Pacific Islander; and two or more (multiple) races.
