= Elliot Levine =

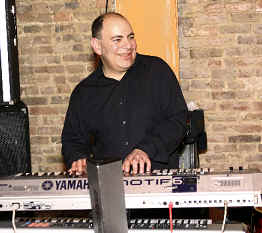

Background information
- Born: Elliot Brett Levine; September 28, 1963 (age 62); Washington, D.C., United States
- Genres: Funk; Smooth Jazz; Jazz pop
- Occupation: Musician
- Instruments: Piano; Electric Piano
- Years active: 1984–present
- Label: Artifex records
- Website: elliotlevine.com

Elliot Brett Levine (born September 28, 1963) is an American pianist and keyboardist. He had two record releases on the Nashville-based Artifex records label between 1999 and 2004. His CD projects have been reviewed in the Wall Street Journal Online and the Washington Post. In March 2012 he was the first person to use an iPad Keytar, an iPad with a guitar strap, in a live performance posted to YouTube.

Levine has toured with Wilson Pickett and is a member of Heatwave (Always & Forever/Boogie Nights). He has opened for Brian McKnight, Freddie Jackson, McCoy Tyner, and Gerald Albright. He has had the #1 song, "Urban Groove" on mp3.com, receiving over 1,000,000 downloads, which was mentioned in the Wall Street Journal and CNN.

Levine has four internationally released CDs. He has headlined at Blues Alley and the Kennedy Center. His playing has been described by Jazz Times as "showing plenty of talent, though also criticized as having "feather-weight play against heavy-leaden R&B backdrops". In 2003, he scored the music to an Emmy nominated documentary, "Teens in Between". His music was also used on "Inside the NBA" on TBS (TV Channel) (2001), as well as an independent college movie, "Friends With Benefits" (2003). He is also featured on the worldwide Karvavena release "The Abduction of the Art of Noise". He currently tours in the United States as a member of Heatwave. During 2020/2021, he performed a series of streamed backyard performances which raised over $2,000 each for the Maryland Food Bank and Shepherd's Table during the COVID-19 pandemic It was also reported that he is part owner of Authentic (racehorse), the horse that won the Kentucky Derby Since 2016, Elliot Levine has provided a scholarship each year to Wheaton_High_School jazz ensemble members accepted into an accredited college. The scholarship is funded to continue for 100 years as long or as long as the school is open.

== Discography ==
=== As leader ===
- Sugar Honey Iced Tea (2022) Tilley
- 347 Live! (2013) Tilley
- Live +7 (2007) Tilley
- The Funk, The Whole Funk, and Nothin' But the Funk (2004) Tilley
- Live Bootleg (2001) MP3.COM
- Live at Bayou Blues (2001) MP3.COM
- Smash, with Ron Holloway (2000) Tilley
- Urban Grooves (1997) Artifex Records
- Urban Grooves EP (1997) Artifex Records
- With Light Images (1993) Artifex Records

=== As sideman ===
- Keith Mason, All Things Made New (2026) Independent
- Devon Howard, I Couldn't Love You More (DocSonny House Remix) (2026) Independent
- Christenelle Diroc, Think that I'm Sorry (2026) Independent
- Teddy Douglas, I'm Here (2024) Nervous_Records_(US)
- Devon Howard, Treat You Right (2024) Independent
- Christian "Big New York" de Mesones, You Only Live Twice (2023) Independent #50 Billboard Smooth Jazz
- Keith Mason, I Surrender All (2020) Independent
- Christian "Big New York" de Mesones, They Call me Big New York (2020) Independent
- Christian "Big New York" de Mesones, Latin Jive Redux (2017) Independent
- Christian "Big New York" de Mesones, Good Old Days (2016) Independent
- Kenny Wright Experience, Herbie Miles and Me (2010) Knee Deep Records
- Tony Whitfield, Pleasure Sensitive 2 (2004) OASA Records
- Tony Whitfield, New York Hustle, with Onaje Allan Gumbs, Hiram Bullock, and Jerry Hey (2003) OASA Records
- Eddie Anderson, Good Friends (2003) Independent
- Eddie Anderson, Christmas Album (2002) Independent
- Tony Whitfield, Pleasure Sensitive 2 (2000) OASA Records
- Ski Johnson, Ski Supreme (2000) Wide-A-Wake Records
- Pete Marinovich, Second Voice (1999)
- Eddie Anderson, Thick Funk (1999) Independent
- Moose and the Bulletproof Blues Band, Movin On' (1996) Blues Cancer Records
- Ski Johnson, in Your Eyes (1994) Wide-A-Wake Records
- Ski Johnson, Tell Me Something Good EP (1994) Wide-A-Wake Records
- Ivan Smart, Red Nights (1992) Smart-eye Productions

=== Compilations ===
- The Abduction of the Art of Noise (2004) Karvavena Records
- Walking on Pennsylvania Avenue (2001) Open Source Music
- MP3.COM 103 of the best songs you've never heard, vol. 4 (2000) MP3.COM
- The Best of Artifex Records (1997) Artifex Records
- Artifex Records American Express Jazz Sampler (1994) Artifex Records
