= Damascus High School =

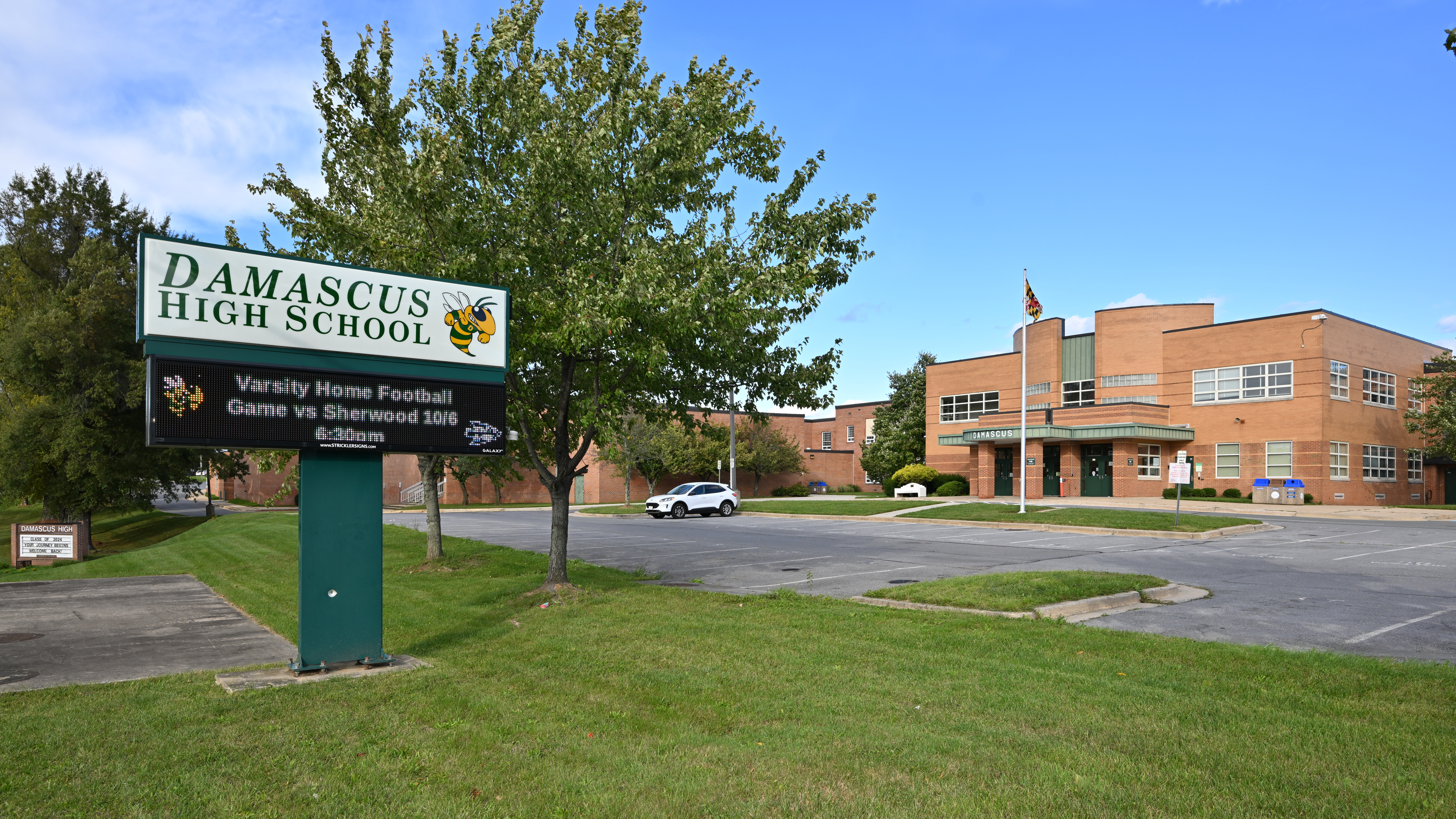

Location
- 25921 Ridge Road; Damascus, Maryland 20872; United States; 39°16′56″N 77°12′38″W

Information
- Type: Public high school
- Motto: Quid agis agas bene ("Whatever you do, do it well")
- Established: 1909; 117 years ago
- School district: Montgomery County Public Schools
- CEEB code: 210460
- NCES School ID: 240048001455
- Principal: Bradley Rohner
- Teaching staff: 86.20 FTE (2024–25)
- Grades: 9–12
- Gender: Co-educational
- Enrollment: 1,390 (2024–25)
- Student to teacher ratio: 16.13 (2024–25)
- Campus type: Suburban
- Colors: Green and gold
- Athletics conference: MPSSAA 3A
- Mascot: Hornet
- Nickname: Swarmin' Hornets
- Rivals: Seneca Valley High School; Clarksburg High School; Sherwood High School
- Newspaper: The Buzz
- Yearbook: The Scimitar
- Feeder schools: John T. Baker Middle School; Hallie Wells Middle School
- Website: www.montgomeryschoolsmd.org/schools/damascushs/

Damascus High School (DHS) is a public high school in Damascus, Maryland, United States. It is part of the Montgomery County Public Schools system.

== History ==
Damascus High School was first established in 1909. The current building was constructed in 1950 and renovated in 1978.

In 2017, the Damascus community raised $15,000 to have the high school's "Swarmin' Hornet" mascot painted onto a water tower overlooking the football field; however, Georgia Tech objected due to the hornet's resemblance to their yellowjacket mascot, Buzz. In order to avoid a legal battle, the fundraisers opted to paint a green-and-gold "D" on the water tower instead.

In 2020, MCPS approved a major renovation of the high school building. Construction was originally planned to begin in 2023 and end in 2025, with a proposed budget of $127 million, but the project was delayed several times due to county fiscal concerns. In 2026, MCPS shared updated plans which increased the project's budget to $306 million and placed the construction timeline from 2028 to 2031, with demolition of the old building finalizing in 2032. The new building will have a capacity of 2,250 students (up from 1,543) with an increased area of about 132,000 square feet, and will likely be four or more stories high.

=== Graduation ceremonies ===
Damascus is notable for hosting its own graduation ceremonies on the school football field. By 2016, it was the only public high school in the area to do so. In 2025, however, MCPS issued a directive requiring all district high schools to hold their graduation ceremonies on the University of Maryland, Baltimore County campus from 2026 onward, causing Damascus' longstanding tradition to come to an end, despite some backlash from students and families.

== Athletics ==
Damascus' school colors are green and gold, and its mascot is the Swarmin' Hornet. The school's biggest rivalries are with the neighboring Clarksburg, Sherwood, and Seneca Valley high schools.

Damascus is known for its prestigious football program. The Swarmin' Hornets have appeared in 17 MPSSAA state championships and won 12, the most of any high school in Maryland. (Note: Damascus shares this state record with the nearby Seneca Valley High School, which also has 12, but last won in 2002.) Since winning their first state title in 1981, Damascus has usually won at least three in each decade, and most recently were crowned champions in 2022. From 2015 to 2017, the football team kept a 53-game winning streak, which is another state record, and was likely a national record at the time. This period included three consecutive state championships.

The school's wrestling program has also been very successful, boasting 16 total state titles across tournaments and dual meets. From 2013 to 2020, the team won 182 consecutive dual meets, collecting eight consecutive dual meet state titles in the process. This was the third‑longest winning streak ever recorded nationally in the sport, and the longest active one.

=== State championships ===
Sport		Years
Baseball		1998, 2000
Basketball	Boys	1949
Cross country	Boys	1961, 1965, 2009
Cross country	Girls	1994
Football		1981, 1992, 1993, 1996, 2003, 2005, 2007, 2015, 2016, 2017, 2019, 2022
Golf		1993
Indoor track	Boys	2010
Indoor track	Girls	1997, 2011
Soccer	Boys	2023
Softball		1987, 1992, 1994, 2023
Swim & dive	Girls	2022, 2025
Volleyball		2013
Wrestling	Tournament	1994, 1996, 1999, 2015, 2016, 2017
Wrestling	Dual meet	1995, 1999, 2013, 2014, 2015, 2016, 2017, 2018, 2019, 2020

=== 2018 football hazing incident ===
In October of 2018, during the fall football season, four players on Damascus' junior varsity team were sexually assaulted with broomsticks by teammates in the locker room, as part of a hazing ritual. The school administration waited more than 12 hours after learning about the incident before contacting police. Initially, six players were charged with rape in juvenile court. Within a month, however, one suspect's charges were dropped, and another was moved to juvenile court. The prosecution then filed stronger adult charges for the remaining four suspects, but the defense successfully argued for their transfer back to juvenile court, allowing them to be released on $20,000 bond. Since these four trials proceeded in juvenile court, their outcomes were not made public. The victims' families subsequently filed a civil lawsuit against the school district, and in 2023 they received a settlement totaling $9.7 million.

== Notable alumni ==
- Christian M. M. Brady, theological scholar and current president of Wittenberg University
- Bryan Bresee, NFL player
- Jake Funk, NFL player and Super Bowl LVI champion
- Michael Jurgens, NFL player
- Joel Ross, CFL player
- Brian Stelter, political commentator
- Kevin Thompson, NFL player
- Joe Tippett, actor
