= Downcounty Consortium =

Group of schools in Maryland, United States

The Downcounty Consortium (DCC) is a group of five high schools in part of Montgomery County, Maryland, U.S. The high schools are Albert Einstein High School, John F. Kennedy High School, Montgomery Blair High School, Wheaton High School and Northwood High School.

Some parts of the Bethesda-Chevy Chase cluster were also considered to be rezoned to Blair, and therefore become part of the consortium, but there was strong public opposition and the proposed change did not occur.

Introduced in 2004, each Downcounty Consortium high school offers different academy programs catered to the interests of a student. These academies are open to all students in the Downcounty Consortium area. After a student chooses one academy and takes four of that particular academy's classes, the student is eligible for a special certificate. Students also participate in internships as they are referred through the program.

The schools that feed into the Downcounty Consortium are Argyle Middle School, Eastern Middle School, Odessa Shannon Middle School, A. Mario Loiederman Middle School, Newport Mill Middle School, Parkland Middle School, Sligo Middle School, Silver Spring International Middle School and Takoma Park Middle School.

== Choice process ==
The Downcounty Consortium choice process allows students to request certain high schools to attend. The students rank high schools by preference, which is often related to the school's academies. They are then entered into a lottery system that assigns students' schools based on factors such as preferences, capacity and socio-economic status. Students may also opt to choose their base high school, in which case they are guaranteed to be assigned to that school. An academy is a set of classes that focus on a specific subject, such as theater, photography, or law. Unlike in a magnet where students must pass a test to be accepted, students get into academies by requesting them at the end of ninth grade, and begin them in tenth grade.

== List of Downcounty Consortium academies by school ==
=== Montgomery Blair High School ===
- Entrepreneurship and Business Management
- Human Service Professions
- International Studies and Law
- Media, Music, and The Arts
- Science, Technology, Engineering, and Math

=== Albert Einstein High School ===
- Finance, Business Management, and Marketing
- International Baccalaureate (IB) Program
- Renaissance (mixed subjects)
- Visual and Performing Arts (VAPA)
- Teacher's Academy (TAM)

=== John F. Kennedy High School ===
- Business Management
- Health Careers
- International Baccalaureate Diploma Program
- Media Communications
- Naval Junior Reserve Officer Training Corps (NJROTC)

=== Northwood High School ===
- Humanities, Arts, and Media (HAM)
- Musical Theater
- Politics, Advocacy, and Law (PAL)
- Technology, Environmental, and Systems Sciences (TESS)

=== Wheaton High School ===
- Biosciences and Health Professions
- Engineering
- Information Technology (AOIT)
- Institute for Global and Cultural Studies (IGCS)
