= Clay Huffman =

American artist

Clay Huffman (1957–2001) was a multi-medium artist, most well known for his vibrant, multicolored serigraphs of local roadside architecture.

== Early life ==
A native born Washingtonian, having grown up in Rockville MD and graduated from Wheaton High School, Clay Huffman experienced early artistic success as a ceramist. By the age of seventeen, and spurred by a desire to expand his creative repertoire, Clay became a student and artist-in-residence at the original Torpedo Factory Art Center (his workspace was where they had once stored documents from the Nuremberg Trials). During this same period, he attended the Montgomery College School of Architecture, an experience which would dramatically affect his future artistic direction and technique. Turning his newly acquired drafting skills towards silkscreen printing, Clay spent the next three years studying the art from nationally recognized masters of the craft, Marcel and Anne Laddon.

== Awards ==
The union of his experience, talent, and unique subject matter provided Clay with a series of national awards and honors beginning throughout the United States including the Athenaeum 13th Annual Juried Show, the North Carolina Sixth Printing and Drawing Exhibition, and the 27th Hunterdon National Print Exhibition. Some highlights of this period came in 1993, when one of his silkscreens was selected for display at the prestigious Coconut Grove Arts Festival. Clay's reputation has since reached international levels with his work now displayed in corporate offices, private collections, and art institutions around the world. Most recently, four of Clay's major works were purchased for the American Embassy in Beijing, China. Clay also sent three major works to the US Embassy in Nairobi. Clay's silkscreen prints have earned unanimous praise from respected art critics and collectors across the country.

Continuing his artistic development in the creative environment of the Torpedo Factory Art Center, Clay drew his serigraph inspirations from a variety of sources ranging from the instantly recognizable icons of fast-food franchises to fast-disappearing islands of small business and local gossip. With a penchant for elevating the seemingly mundane to the monumental, Clay often focused—literally and figuratively—on "those places we pass each day and take little notice of".

Before beginning a silkscreen project, Clay photographs a prospective location from multiple perspectives and at various times of day to prepare the composition.

== Creating Silkscreens ==
The actual process of creating a silkscreen includes many steps. Since Clay's work was generally of actual places and things (with the occasional exception of some imaginative additions such as a Cinderellaesque figure running to catch the last train in his print titled "Metropolitan Curfew"), his first step was to take photographic images of the subject at different times to catch it with different shadows, lighting and character. Clay then selected one of these photographs and, wanting to influence the final print, created a line drawing of it. From the line drawing, Clay had to decide what color went where and cut out individual stencils for each area and color choice. Each stencil was then applied to a silkscreen, and one by one, ink was forced through the screen onto the paper, eventually creating the finished piece. This individual silkscreen process was used for every color on every print.

Unlike images created using a printing press (which uses pressure applied to copper plates to create an impression which can deteriorate in quality from the first print to the last), a silkscreen has no deterioration of the screen during printing. This consistency in print quality throughout the edition means that lower numbered prints should not be more desirable than higher numbered prints, except when determined by the artist.

Clay Huffman kept the first 10 prints of each of his silkscreens, he called it his "pension plan". As the prints sold, the first ten would become increasingly valuable. He sold one of his ten originals of a Krispy Kreme doughnut shop for $750. The original price was $150. Another silkscreen artist with a similar, yet almost opposite, business plan is Zachary Kent of Kent Designs. Kent currently specializes in rock art (collectible pieces commemorating an event, concert or show). After creating a new piece, Kent auctions the first handful (usually numbers 1–5) on eBay , starting with the higher number and selling through to number one in the edition before offering the rest for sale.

Not content with merely being a serigraph historian, Clay set in motion a developmental process combining his life's work and experience including his study of ceramics, architecture, stained glass, neon fabrication and design. His fascination with three-dimensional imaging can be seen in his whimsical and possibly prophetic piece, "Man's Best Friend in 2084". This piece, nicknamed "Robot" with an image of the same, was printed in four versions; black, gold, silver & copper. It was completed in September 1984 and printed on 26"x34" paper.

With his blend of humor and nostalgia, Clay's work was noted by his attention to detail and technique. Each edition (rarely exceeding 200 impressions) would take Clay up to three months to complete.

== Mission ==
One of his missions as an artist, he maintained, was preservation of disappearing styles of architecture and the giving of new life to bright and colorful signs that increasingly tend to be limited and dulled by modern building regulations and code restrictions. The buildings and objects shown in his silkscreens, he said, were "beautiful at one point. Now they're places we don't even notice. Once they knock them down, we miss them".

Clay Huffman died on January 15, 2001, at his home in Alexandria, VA, of complications related to AIDS and kidney failure. He had known that he was HIV positive for about 15 years before his death but maintained an ambitious work schedule. He was an organizer of the annual Torpedo Factory Mardi-Gras fund raising ball and had an interest in model railroad trains. After his death, remaining pieces of his work were handled by the Executor of his Estate, mentor and friend, Marcel who also had a studio at the Torpedo Factory Arts Center in Alexandria, VA but has since also died. After his death, a small, one week memorial exhibition and sale was held at the Torpedo Factory's Target Gallery.

Clay Huffman's work has been compared to that of fellow Washingtonian, Joseph Craig English. One of Clay's most recognizable pieces "Pigmentation on Powhatan" (nicknamed "Dixie II" or "Dixie Pig"), can be seen at ClayHuffman.com. His work "Last Call" can be seen at Sunforged Studios. Unfortunately, online representations of his pieces are rare although his popularity with collectors has grown in recent years.

== Portfolio ==
- The pieces below can be found at ClayHuffman.com

PRINT NAME	NICKNAME	NUMBER OF COLORS	FRAMED SIZE	DATE COMPLETED
01474 Equalizer	N/A	Unknown	Unknown	Unknown
Sweet Break	N/A	Unknown	Unknown	Unknown
Intermission	Candy Machine	33	17" x 20.5"	10/79
Progress Around Johnson's	Johnson's Full	40	20" x 26"	07/81
For Ice See Clerk In Store	Ice Box	26	14" x 18"	09/81
If You Can't Find It Ask	Front Door	22	14" x 18"	08/81
For Local Calls Deposit 20c	Telephone	Unknown	14" x 18"	11/81
Johnson's Store All A Glo	Johnson's Neon	26	14" x 32"	01/82
Demolition Man	Demo Man	45	26" x 32"	08/82
Escaping Steam	Steam	14	12.5" x 17.25"	09/82
It Will Be Ready At Five	Garage	26	26" x 32"	09/83
Two Burgers Fries And Coffee	Little Tavern	Unknown	26" x 32"	05/84
Man's Best Friend in 2084	Robot Black	14	26" x 34"	09/84
Man's Best Friend in 2084	Robot Gold	14	26" x 34"	09/84
Man's Best Friend in 2084	Robot Silver	14	26" x 34"	09/84
Man's Best Friend in 2084	Robot Copper	14	26" x 34"	09/84
National Facelift	Liberty	14	14" x 32"	12/84
Hot Doughnuts Now	Krispy Kreme	Unknown	26" x 32"	03/85
We'll Have Oil In Your Tank...	Fannon Oil	65	26" x 32"	04/85
One Cheeseburger Sub-To Go	Little Tavern	Unknown	26" x 32"	Unknown
Puzzling Name For An Art Center	Torpedo Factory	Unknown	14" x 17"	Unknown
On A Universal Tour	Halley	36	14" x 32"	12/85
Club LT All A Glow	Club LT	30	20" x 26"	03/86
Metropolitan Curfew	Metro	32	14" x 32"	06/86
Patriotic Emblem	Small McD	12	18" x 24"	10/86
Corporate Infant	McD	32	18" x 24"	10/86
Radio Daze	Radio	25	11" x 14"	04/87
Video Fix	Bob's TV	30	11" x 14"	07/87
Lock-Smith	Wig	35	11" x 14"	08/87
G.C. & Co.	Murphy's	12	11" x 14"	09/87
Suppression Of The Masses	Corset	65	26" x 32"	05/88
Spirited Glow	Central	20	18" x 24"	06/88
High Voltage Speedee	Speedee	32	26" x 32"	08/88
Goodbye Luminous Market	Santullos	32	16" x 34"	01/89
Bug Busters	Bug	15	11" x 14"	03/89
Last Call	Whitlow's	30	20" x 26"	05/89
Pastry Palace	Brenners	30	20" x 26"	08/89
Tubular Swine	Dixie	60	26" x 32"	01/90
Royal View	Roller Rink	48	26" x 32"	09/90
Aspiring Market	Giant	45	14" x 32"	12/90
Sails	Hobie	8	14" x 17"	01/91
Too Late	Key Lime	17	11" x 14"	02/91
Burning Bright Tonight	Shorty's	30	20" x 26"	03/91
Coin Slot	Bank	60	16" x 34"	08/91
Celebration	Fireworks	31	26" x 32"	12/91
2000 Park	Collins Park	17	9" x 11"	02/92
1000 Collins	Fairmont	17	9" x 11"	02/92
720 Ocean	Beacon	17	9" x 11"	02/92
1220 Collins	Webster	17	9" x 11"	02/92
1420 Ocean Dr.	Crescent	17	12" x 18"	02/92
Miami Set	All 4 Miami	17	10.5" x 25.5"	02/92
Flemish Bond (Alex. House)	Brick	10	11" x 14"	07/92
Subterranean Jewels	Grand Central	Unknown	27" x 33"	Unknown
Up Your Alley	Bowling	50	15" x 33"	Unknown
