= Hallie Wells Middle School =

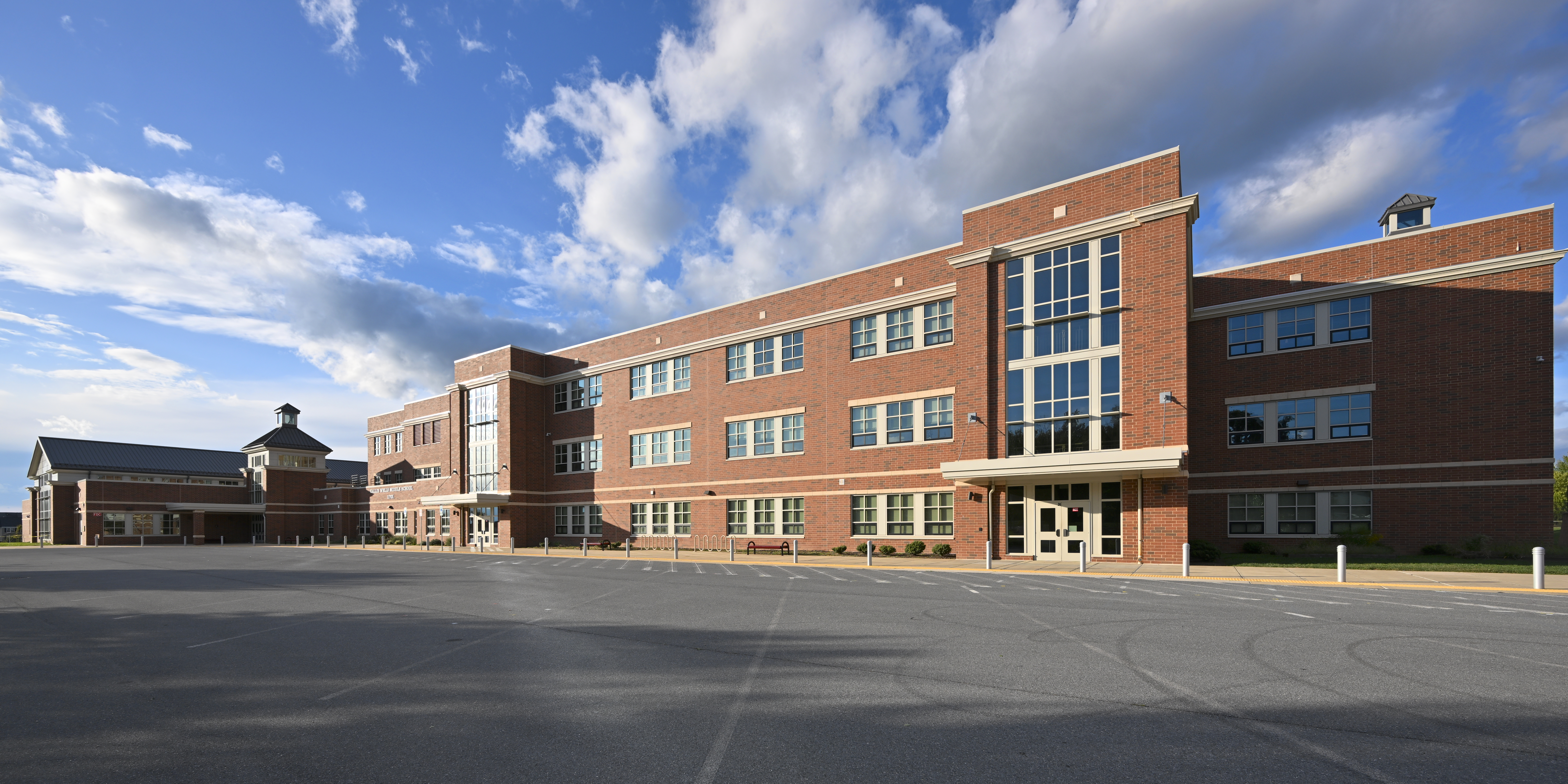

Location
- 11701 Little Seneca Parkway; Clarksburg, Montgomery County, Maryland, Maryland 20871; United States; 39°13′57″N 77°14′24″W

Information
- Type: Middle school
- Established: 24 August, 2016
- Principal: Dr. Carla M. McNeal
- Colors: Black and red
- Mascot: Mustangs
- Website: https://www.montgomeryschoolsmd.org/schools/halliewellsms/

Hallie Wells Middle School is a public middle school serving grades 6–8 in Clarksburg, Maryland. It is part of Montgomery County Public Schools (MCPS) and enrolls 901 students. The school offers a range of academic programs including Gifted & Talented services and Project Lead The Way coursework.

== Overview ==
=== Academics and programs ===
Hallie Wells Middle School provides a standard middle school curriculum aligned with MCPS expectations.

=== Student life and extracurriculars ===
Hallie Wells has student organizations (clubs, performing arts practices, intramural athletics calendars, and student publications such as a literary magazine). Hallie Wells Middle School also has a hip hop program. In 2020, he received a $30,000 award from Chance the Rapper.

== History ==
=== Opening ===
Hallie Wells Middle School was opened on August 24th, 2016 taking in students from Rocky Hill Middle School. During its first year open, it served 6th and 7th graders, but it opened to 8th grade the next year.

The school was named after Hallie Ausmus Wells, who donated 290 acres to the Montgomery County Parks Department in 1981, which was named Ovid Hazen Wells Park. The school mascot, the Mustang, was chosen to honor the Ovid Hazen Wells Park carousel, which was relocated from Wheaton to Clarksburg in April 2026.

== Campus and facilities ==
Athletic facilities include a large gymnasium, wrestling gymnasium, a weight lifting room and a dance auxiliary gymnasium. One of the fitness rooms was constructed in partnership with MoveStrong Fitness

Exterior features include several baseball fields, outdoor basketball and tennis courts, and a walking path.

== Demographics ==
Hallie Wells Middle School (2023)
American Indian or Alaskan Native		≤5.0
Asian		42.6
Black or African American		19.8
Hispanic/Latino		12.9
Native Hawaiian or Other Pacific Islander		≤5.0
Two or More Races		5.2
White		19.4

As of 2023, less than 5% of all students were American Indian or Alaskan Native, 42.6% of all students were Asian, 19.8% of all students were Black or African American, 12.9% of all students were Hispanic/Latino, less than 5% of all students were Native Hawaiian or Other Pacific Islander, 5.2% of all students were Two or More Races, and 19.4% of all students were white.

Hallie Wells Middle School serves students from three elementary schools, Wilson Wims Elementary School, Snowden Farm Elementary School, and Cedar Grove Elementary School. It feeds into two high schools, Clarksburg High School (Wilson Wims and part of Snowden Farm) and Damascus High School (part of Cedar Grove and Snowden Farm).
