= Wheaton High School =

Coordinates: 39°3′35″N 77°4′3″W

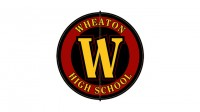

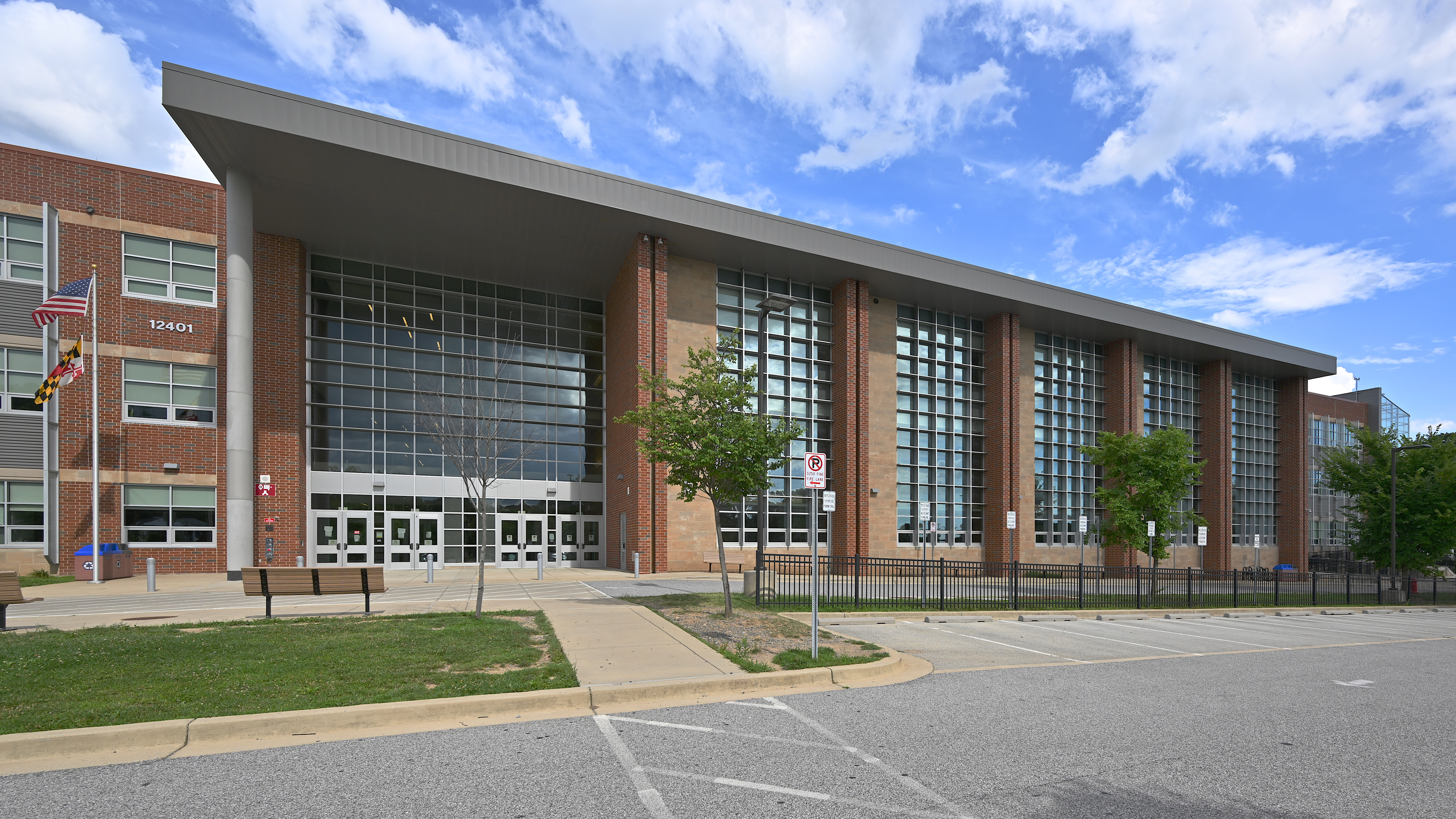

Location
- 12401 Dalewood Drive; Silver Spring, Maryland; United States

Information
- Type: Public
- Established: September 7, 1954; 72 years ago
- School district: Montgomery County Public Schools
- Principal: Pamela Krawczel
- Teaching staff: 148.11 (on an FTE basis)
- Grades: 9–12
- Enrollment: 2,375 (2022–23)
- Student to teacher ratio: 16.04
- Campus: Suburban
- Colors: Crimson and gold
- Mascot: Knight
- Rival: John F. Kennedy High School
- Yearbook: The Lance
- Website: Wheaton High School

Wheaton High School is a U.S. four-year public high school in Montgomery County, Maryland. It is located in the unincorporated Wheaton-Glenmont section of Montgomery County, near Silver Spring, about 5 miles north of Washington, D.C.

The high school is a part of the Montgomery County Public School system and a member of its Downcounty Consortium. The school is named for the Wheaton area, which is in turn named for Frank Wheaton (1833–1903), a career officer in the Union Army who rose to the rank of major-general while serving before, during, and after the Civil War.

The school used to be physically connected to the Thomas Edison High School of Technology, named in honor of the famous American inventor.

== Academies ==
Wheaton High School has four main academies of education: the Academy of Biosciences and Medicine, the Academy of Engineering (voted the top CTE program in Maryland), the Academy of Information Technology, and the Academy of International Global and Cultural Studies.

== Magnets ==
The Wheaton High School magnet program was launched at the beginning of the 2012–2013 school year. There are two magnet programs, Biomedical and Engineering.

== Music ==
The Institute of Global and Cultural Studies has a state of the art digital music lab featuring 34 new iMac computers and Roland Fp-4 keyboards equipped with studio microphones and such software as Garageband, Logic, Final Cut, Sibelius, and Synthesia. The lab is unique in music education because it incorporates the composition, production, and performance of popular music styles like electronic music and rap into the curriculum.

== Academics ==
In 2017, U.S. News & World Report ranked Wheaton High School the 27th best school in Maryland, and 1,019th nationally. U.S. News & World Report noted that Wheaton High School's Advanced Placement participation rate is 70 percent.

In 2018, Wheaton High School won the state Science Bowl competition and represented the state of Maryland at the National Science Bowl.

== Sports ==
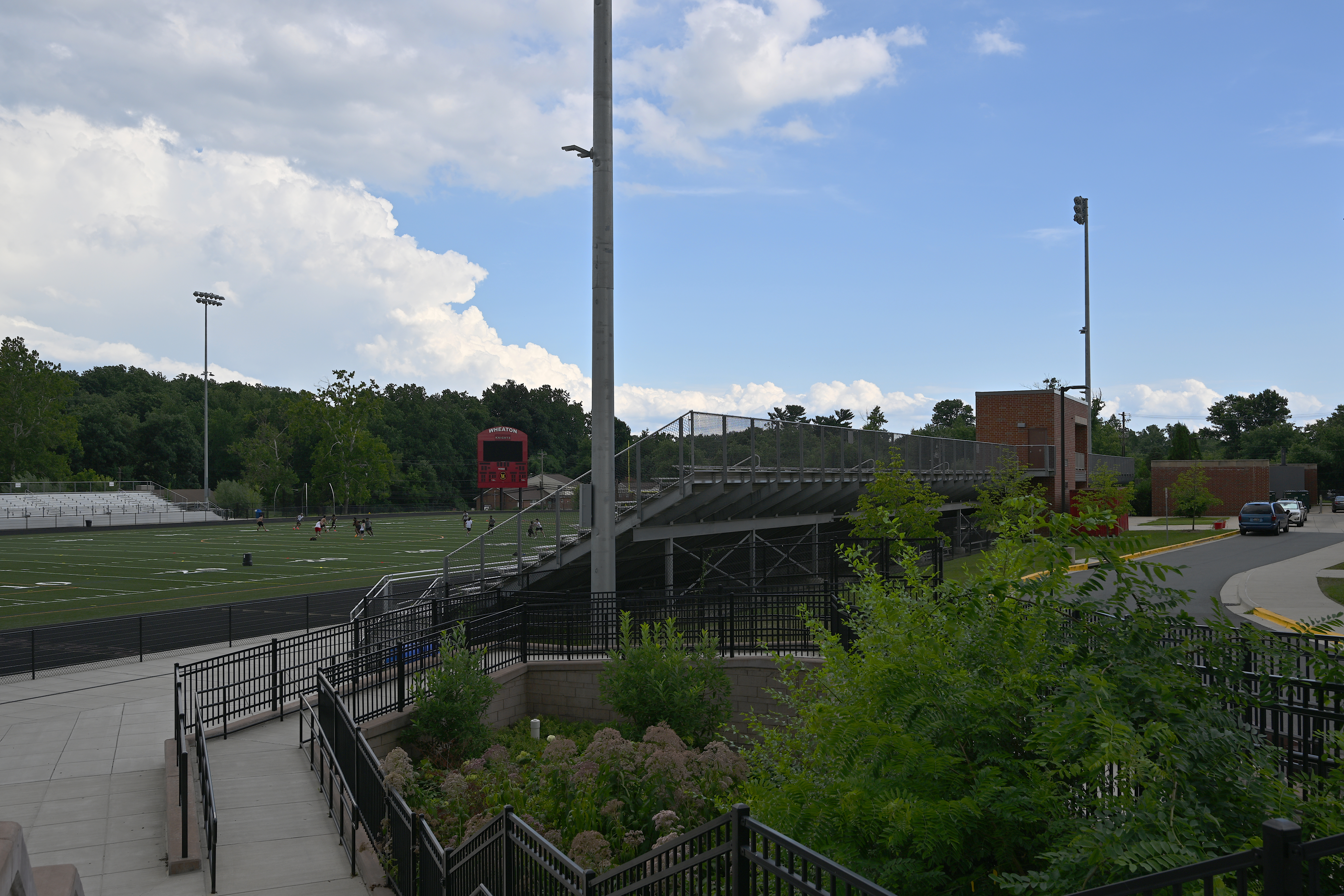
Wheaton High School stadium

The school mascot is the Wheaton Knight, representative of valor, chivalry, and bravery.

Wheaton's athletic teams have brought home several state championships. The football team captured a 2A state championship in 1996 and was a state finalist in 1994. It also was state semifinalist in 1979 and 1980. A decade earlier, before the state championship system was implemented, Wheaton earned back-to-back county co-championships in football by upending highly ranked Richard Montgomery in the season finales of both 1969 and 1970. The girls' basketball team won state championships in 1985, 1997 and 1998. It also was state finalist in 1976 and 1982. The boys' gymnastics teams of the 1970s, coached by Bernie Michels, regularly dominated competition in Montgomery County.

On October 31, 2023, the Wheaton Girls Soccer Team won its first Regional Championship beating Richard Montgomery 2 - 0.

Wheaton's primary rival is John F. Kennedy High School, located down Randolph Road. The rivalry is fueled by the schools' close proximity to one another. The Wheaton-Kennedy competitive rivalry is one of the oldest in Montgomery County. Wheaton's main rival in the 1960s was Richard Montgomery High School in Rockville, before Kennedy High School was built.

=== Fall sports ===
- Cross country
- Cheerleading
- Field hockey
- Football
- Golf
- Pompon
- Soccer
- Tennis
- Girls Volleyball

=== Winter sports ===
- Basketball
- Indoor track
- Swimming and Diving
- Wrestling
- Bocce

Wheaton High School has produced several titles in winter sports to include multiple boys' and girls' basketball State Championships and Wrestling State Champions. In Wrestling, Wheaton has the longest running tradition of state qualifiers in the entire state of Maryland that has not been broken since 1970. The next closest in comparison is Damascus High School, with a 27-year-long run from 1982 to 2009.

=== Spring sports ===
- Baseball
- Lacrosse
- Softball
- Tennis
- Track and field
- Boys and coed volleyball

== Renovation ==
Wheaton High School along with the adjoining Thomas Edison High School of Technology were entirely reconstructed where Wheaton's football and baseball fields were previously located. Since other schools were too full to accommodate Wheaton's student body, the original building was not demolished until the new buildings were completed. After initial debate, construction was completed by building the two high schools in separate buildings instead of being joined as it was previously. Wheaton High School had its last home football game during the 2012-2013 season before construction began on the site where the football field was located.

In January 2016, Wheaton High School took up residence in the new building located at the corner of Randolph Road and Dalewood Drive. In September 2019, Wheaton had its first football game after the construction of the new field was completed.

== Project-based Curriculum ==
Along with the upcoming renovation, curriculum changes are being integrated into Wheaton High. The current Engineering and Biomedical Magnets are curricula based on Project Lead The Way standards. This is the basis for a project-based curriculum which is to be integrated into as many subjects as possible. This project-based curriculum will give students more hands-on projects and fewer lectures and quizzes. If successful, the curriculum technique is expected to influence other high schools in the Montgomery County school system.

== History ==
The school opened its doors on September 7, 1954, as Wheaton Junior–Senior High School. The 75,000-square-foot (7,000 m^{2}) building sat on 27.4 acres of land. Its first principal was Elwood B. Mason. It was designed for 1,534 students. During its first school year, it had 1,400 students enrolled in grades seven to eleven. The school cost $3 million to build.

The name of its athletic teams, the Crimson Knights, was voted in by the students in its first school year. Its football team won three of its seven games during its first season, coached by Lou Chacos.

== Notable alumni ==
- Ayana Akli, tennis player
- Chloe Arnold, tap dancer
- Clay Huffman, silk-screen artist
- Josh Hart, professional basketball player, New York Knicks (transferred out before graduation)
- Joan Jett, musician
- Elliot Levine, keyboard player
- Debra Monk, television and stage actress
- Rachel Stevens, sculptor and art professor
