= Clarksburg High School =

Public school in Maryland, United States

Location
- 22500 Wims Road; Clarksburg, Maryland; United States; 39°13′32″N 77°15′58″W

Information
- Type: Public secondary
- Established: 2006; 20 years ago
- School district: Montgomery County Public Schools
- CEEB code: 210381
- NCES School ID: 240048001541
- Principal: Anita O'Neill
- Teaching staff: 138 FTE (2021-22)
- Grades: 9–12
- Enrollment: 2,316 (2021–22)
- Student to teacher ratio: 16.76
- Campus type: Suburban
- Colors: Carolina blue, navy, and white
- Athletics conference: AAAA
- Mascot: Coyote
- Newspaper: The Howl
- Yearbook: The Quest
- Website: www.montgomeryschoolsmd.org/schools/clarksburghs/

Clarksburg High School is a public high school located at 22500 Wims Road in Clarksburg, Maryland, United States. It is part of the Montgomery County Public Schools system, Maryland's largest public school system. Its students mainly come from Rocky Hill Middle School and Hallie Wells Middle School.

== History ==
The building that currently houses Clarksburg High School originally housed Rocky Hill Middle School until 2004, when a new building for the latter was inaugurated a short distance from it.

== Campus ==
Increasing enrollment forced Clarksburg to install four portable classrooms for the 2008–09 school year. The first four portables were located on a parking lot outside of the main gymnasium, near the back athletic fields. Four more portables were installed for the 2010–11 school year. These classrooms were installed atop two blacktop areas paved for basketball near the student parking lot (on the opposite side of the school as the initial relocatable classrooms). The social studies department currently occupies these portable classrooms. During the 2011–12 school year, Clarksburg was forced to install two more portables, overtaking yet another blacktop area. A new wing was built and completed prior to the 2014–15 school year. The lower floor of this wing is used by foreign language courses, while the top floor hosts science classes. As of the 2023-24 school year, Clarksburg has 14 portables.

== Student ==
The student body of the 2025-2026 school year was 14.2% non-Hispanic White, 24.3% Asian, 28.4% African American, 27.1% Hispanic/Latino, less than 5% American Indian, less than 5% Pacific Islander, and 5.2% mixed race.

== Graduation ==
Clarksburg High School seniors have graduated at the Knott Auditorium on the campus of Mount Saint Mary's University since the school's opening. The class of 2025 graduated at the Chesapeake Employer's Arena on the campus of The University of Maryland, Baltimore County.

== Areas served ==
Clarksburg High School mostly serves students in Clarksburg and Germantown, with some from Damascus and Boyds. It's fed by two middle schools and eight elementary schools:

- Rocky Hill MS
  - Clarksburg ES
  - Captain James E. Daly ES
  - Fox Chapel ES
  - William B. Gibbs ES
  - Little Bennett ES
- Hallie Wells MS
  - Cedar Grove ES
  - Snowden Farm ES
  - Wilson Wims ES

Elementary School Split Articulations:

- Gibbs ES: students outside the Clarksburg HS walk zone articulate to Neelsville MS and Seneca Valley HS
- Cedar Grove ES: students outside the west central portion articulate to Damascus HS
- Snowden Farm ES: students in the eastern portion articulate to Damascus HS

=== Recent boundary changes ===
In November 2019, the board of education approved boundaries that affected the following schools within the Clarksburg cluster:

- Southern portion of Clarksburg ES (now Cabin Branch ES) reassigned from Rocky Hill MS and Clarksburg HS to Neelsville MS and Seneca Valley HS
- Gibbs ES (except Clarksburg walkers) reassigned from Rocky Hill MS and Clarksburg HS to Neelsville MS and Seneca Valley HS
- Daly ES from Neelsville MS to Rocky Hill MS
- Fox Chapel ES from Neelsville MS to Rocky Hill MS
- Effectively, Neelsville MS from Clarksburg HS to Seneca Valley HS

== Programs ==
=== APPS program ===
One of Clarksburg's programs is the four-year Advanced Placement Power Scholars program (APPS). Students can apply for the program during eighth or ninth grade. Modeled after Walter Johnson High School's APEX Program, the APPS program requires its members to take a number of rigorous Advanced Placement classes. By the end of a member's senior year, they will have taken at least 6 AP classes, and will have taken the classes' respective exams distributed by the College Board.

APPS students take AP NSL Government their freshman year, AP US History their sophomore year, and more AP classes their junior and senior years. Many take AP English Language and Composition and AP World History as juniors.

=== P-TECH program ===
The Pathways in Network and Information Technology Program (P-TECH) is a dual enrollment program that enables participating students to earn both a MCPS high school diploma and an Associate of Applied Science (AAS) degree from Montgomery College for free while in high school. Both degrees must be completed within six years. The AAS degree will ensure that students will meet industry expectations and gain technical skills and workplace competencies as well as industry certifications. Certifications will be earned in microcomputer technician and network administration in either Microsoft or Cisco or in wireless technologies. Additionally, the program will afford participating students mentoring and a paid summer employment opportunity within the technical industry in Montgomery County. To ensure that all participating students meet the challenges of this program, students participate in a bridge program every summer including the summer before they enter grade 9, but excluding the summer of their paid work experience assignments. Completion of this program guarantees students "first in-line" status for consideration of job opportunities with the program's IT business partners.

=== CHStage ===
CHStage is the award-winning drama department at Clarksburg High School. Two shows, at least one a musical, are produced each year and have included Tarzan, Once Upon a Mattress, The Little Princess, In The Heights, and The Little Mermaid.

=== InvenTeam ===
The Clarksburg High School InvenTeam is one of 16 high school teams in the nation to receive grant funding from the Massachusetts Institute of Technology (MIT). The team presented its TorchCord invention at the March Madness for the Mind event in the National Museum of American History, part of the National Collegiate Inventors and Innovators Alliance's 13th annual meeting in Washington, DC. The team also traveled to MIT for the Lemelson-MIT EurekaFest event in 2009, having created a pressure-sensitive illuminated computer cable.

=== Marching Band ===
The Clarksburg High School Marching Band, nicknamed "The Spirit of Clarksburg," is a competitive corps-style marching ensemble, led by band instructor Charles Orifici.

Notable accomplishments of The Spirit of Clarksburg include performances in Shanghai, China, performing in the Shanghai Tourism Festival Parade at the beginning of the 2009–2010 school year, as well as in the National Cherry Blossom Festival Parade in Washington, D.C., in 2012. They also annually attend the locally televised Montgomery County Thanksgiving Parade in Silver Spring, MD every November.

The Spirit of Clarksburg marching band became the 2019 Tournament of Bands Region 5 Class 3A Champions on October 19, 2019, with their program "Rise of the Phoenix". In the State Finals of the 2019 MMBA (Maryland Marching Band Association) season at Towson University, they placed 5th place against various other bands in the 3A Class. Additionally, in the 2022 competitive season, The Spirit of Clarksburg received 1st place in MMBA state finales at Towson University.

The Clarksburg High School Marching Band also participates in many different events throughout the school and local community. They perform during school pep rallies and during football games at Coyote Canyon, in the stands as well as during half-time. In events such as CSA/Middle School Band Night, the Spirit of Clarksburg works to extend outreach to and inspire students from feeder middle schools, like Rocky Hill or Hallie Wells Middle Schools.

The Clarksburg High School Marching Band also includes the Clarksburg Majorettes, who performs alongside the band at football games and competitions.

=== Choir ===
The Clarksburg High School Choir Program consists of four choirs.

The choir was able to world premiere a song composed by Chandrika Tandon at the 2024 World Culture Festival, along with the choir program of Walt Whitman High School.

== Athletics ==
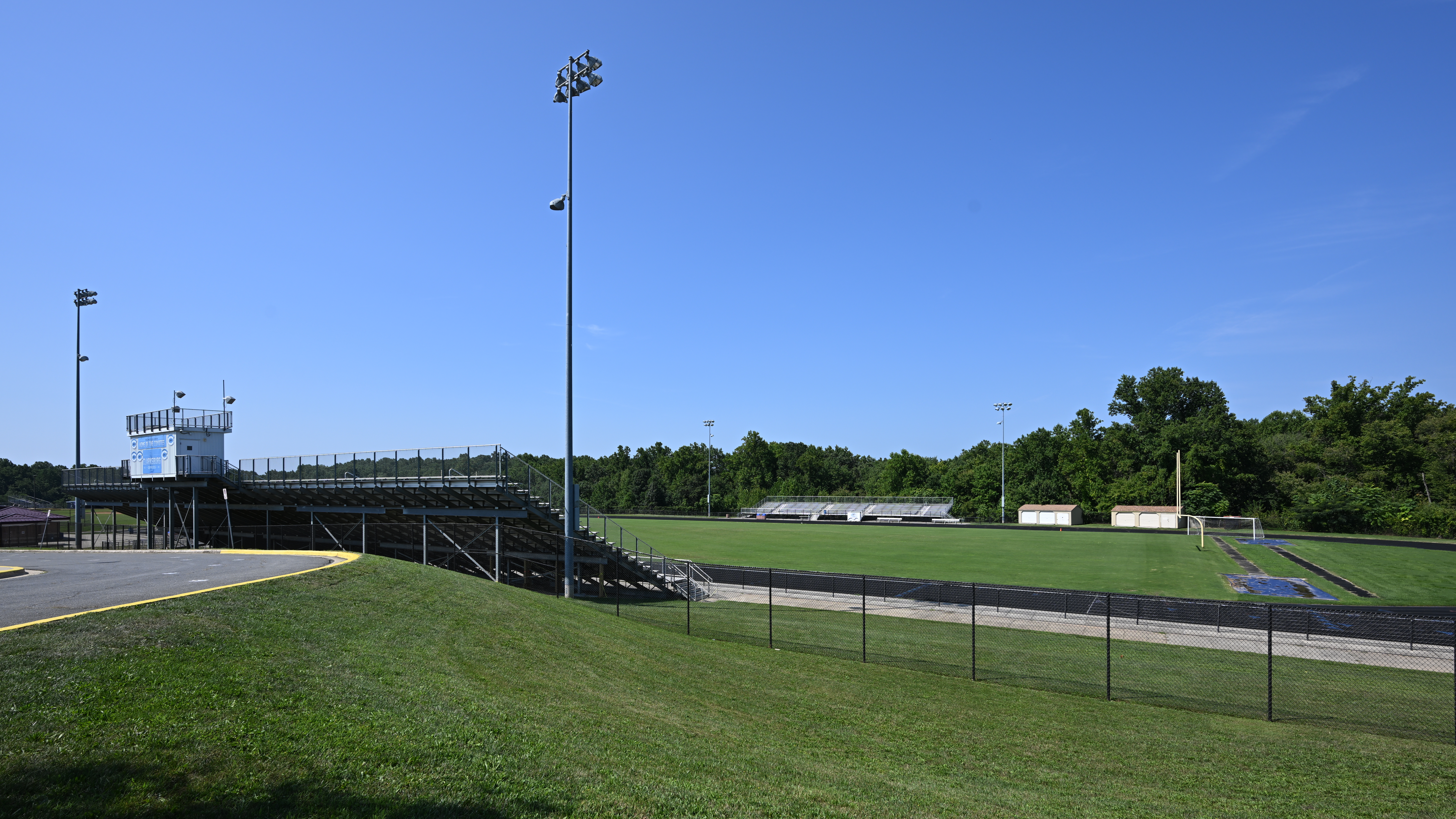
Clarksburg High School Coyotes stadium
