= Albert Einstein High School =

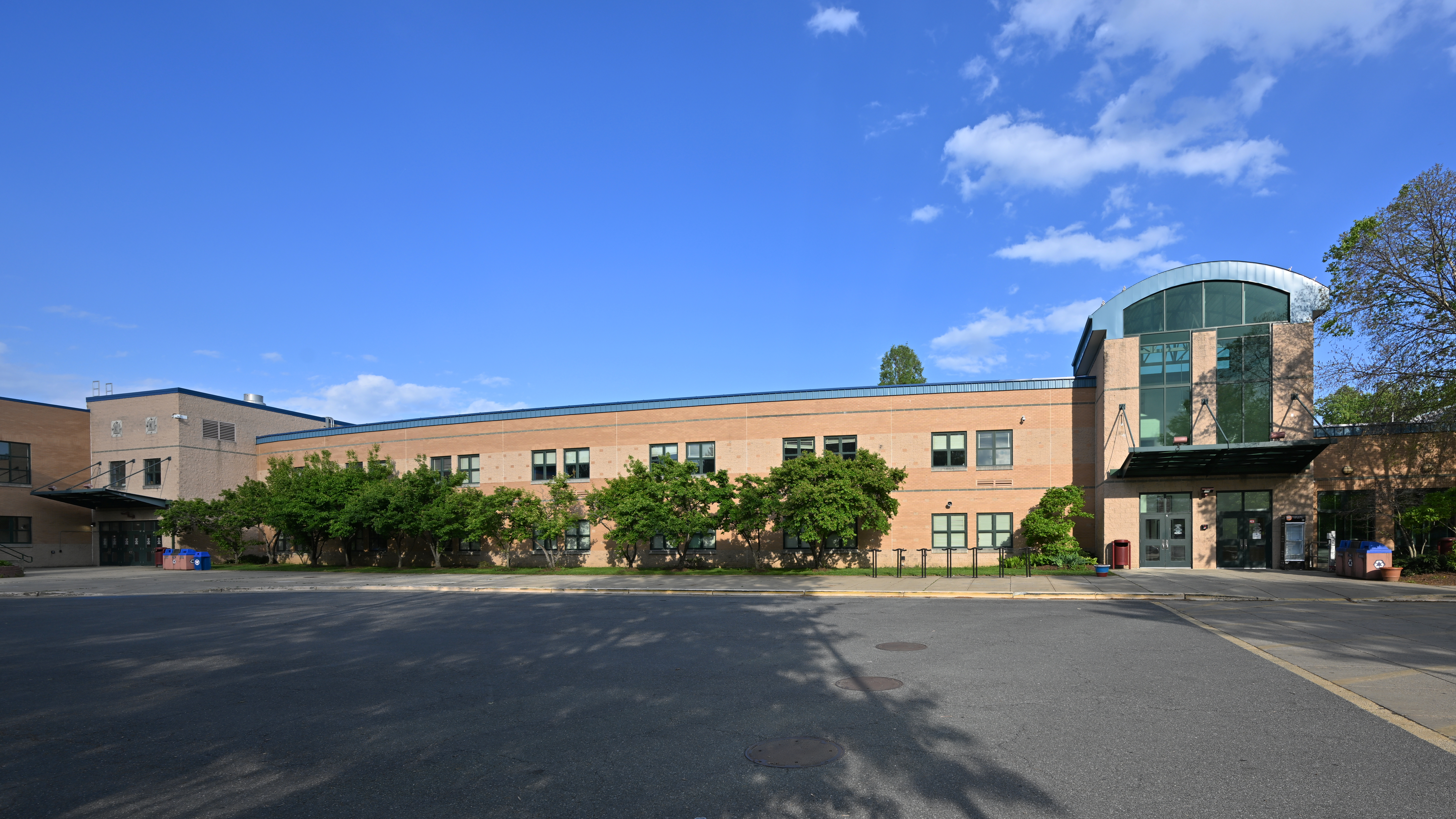

Location
- 11135 Newport Mill Road; Kensington, Maryland; United States; 39.0395°N 77.0672°W

Information
- Type: Public high school
- Motto: "The Place to Be"
- Established: 1962; 64 years ago
- School district: Montgomery County Public Schools
- NCES School ID: 240048000773
- Principal: Mark Brown Jr.
- Teaching staff: 131 FTE (2022-23)
- Grades: 9–12
- Gender: Co-educational
- Enrollment: 2,012 (2022-23)
- Student to teacher ratio: 15.36 (2022-23)
- Campus: Suburban
- Colors: Red, Columbia blue, and white
- Mascot: Titans
- Newspaper: The Nucleus
- Website: www.montgomeryschoolsmd.org/schools/einsteinhs

Albert Einstein High School (AEHS) is a four-year public high school in Kensington, Maryland, United States. It first opened in 1962 and is named after the German-born physicist Albert Einstein. It is part of the Montgomery County Public Schools system.

== Academic programs ==
As a part of the Downcounty Consortium, Einstein offers five "academies", which are academic programs that concentrate in specific fields. These include the Academy of Finance, Business, and Marketing; the International Baccalaureate Program; the Visual and Performing Arts Academy; the Renaissance Academy; and recently the Teacher's Academy. It is also home to Montgomery County's Visual Art Center.

Einstein is home to an International Baccalaureate (IB) Diploma Program, which approaches education from a global perspective and allows students to take high-level classes in pursuit of a specialized diploma.

== Notable alumni ==
- Phil Andrews, politician
- Roscoe Born, actor
- Inés Cifuentes, siesmologist
- Arnold Ebiketie, NFL player
- Marc Elrich, politician
- David Fraser-Hidalgo, politician
- Dan Kolko, sports commentator
- Adam Neely, YouTuber and musician
- Jon Routson, artist
- Jim Spellman, journalist and musician
- Rebecca Sugar, creator of the animated TV series Steven Universe
