= List of parochial and private schools in the Washington metropolitan area =

There are over one hundred parochial and private schools in the Washington Metropolitan Area.

== Private schools ==
=== Washington, D.C. ===
- Acton Academy of Washington, DC (PS-8)
- Aidan Montessori School (PS-6)
- Archbishop Carroll High School (9–12)
- Beauvoir, The National Cathedral Elementary School (PS-3)
- British School of Washington (PS-12)
- Calvary Christian Academy (PS-8)
- Capitol Hill Day School (PS-8)
- Dupont Park Adventist School (PS-3)
- Edmund Burke School (6–12)
- Emerson Preparatory School (9–12)
- The Field School (6–12)
- Georgetown Day School (PS-12)
- Georgetown Visitation Preparatory School (9–12)
- Gonzaga College High School (9–12)
- Kendall Demonstration Elementary School
- Kirov Academy of Ballet (7–12)
- Lab School of Washington (1–12)
- Lowell School (PS-8)
- Maret School (K–12)
- Milton Gottesman Jewish Day School (Prek-8)
- Model Secondary School for the Deaf (9–12)
- Nannie Helen Burroughs School (K–6)
- National Cathedral School (4–12)
- National Presbyterian School (PS-6)
- Parkmont School (6–12)
- Russian Embassy School in Washington, D.C.
- St. Albans School (4–12)
- St. Jerome Institute (9-12)
- St. John's College High School (9–12)
- St. Patrick's Episcopal Day School (PS-8)
- Sheridan School (K–8)
- Sidwell Friends School (PS-12)
- Templeton Academy DC (9–12)
- Washington International School (PS-12)

=== Maryland ===
- Academy of the Holy Cross, Kensington (9–12)
- Ascension Lutheran School, Landover Hills (K–8)
- Auburn School, Silver Spring and Baltimore (K–8)
- Barrie School, Silver Spring (PS-12)
- The Beddow Junior and Senior High School, Accokeek (7–12)
- Bullis School, Potomac (3–12)
- Charles E. Smith Jewish Day School, Rockville (K–12)
- Chelsea School, Hyattsville (5–12)
- Christ Episcopal School, Rockville (PS-8)
- Concord Hill School, Chevy Chase (PS-3)
- Connelly School of the Holy Child, Potomac (6–12)
- DeMatha Catholic High School, Hyattsville (9–12)
- Elizabeth Seton High School, Hyattsville (9-12)
- Feynman School, Potomac (K–12)
- Friends Community School, College Park (K–8)
- Georgetown Preparatory School, North Bethesda (9–12)
- German School, Potomac (PS-12)
- Good Counsel High School, Olney (9-12)
- Grace Episcopal Day School, Kensington (PS-8)
- Green Acres School, Rockville (PS-8)
- Holton-Arms School, Bethesda (3–12)
- Holy Trinity Episcopal Day School, Bowie (PK-8)
- Landon School, Bethesda (3–12)
- Maryland International Day School, Ft. Washington (PK-8)
- McLean School, Potomac (K–12)
- Melvin J. Berman Hebrew Academy, Rockville (PK-12)
- Mysa Micro School, Bethesda (6–12)
- New Hope Academy, Landover Hills (K–12)
- Norwood School, Bethesda (K–8)
- Rochambeau French International School, Bethesda (PS-12)
- St. Andrew's Episcopal School, Potomac (PS-12)
- Saint Jerome Academy (Hyattsville) (PreK-8)
- St. John's Episcopal School, Olney (PS-8)
- Sandy Spring Friends School, Sandy Spring (PS-12)
- Washington Episcopal School, Bethesda (PS-8)
- Washington Waldorf School, Bethesda (PS-12)
- The Woods Academy, Bethesda (PK-8)
- Wye River Upper School, Centreville (9-12)

=== Virginia ===
- Accotink Academy, Springfield (grades 1-12, serving ages 6–21)
- Ad Fontes Academy, Centreville (PK-12)
- Alexandria Country Day School, Alexandria (K–8)
- Auburn School, Chantilly (K–12)
- Basilica School of Saint Mary's (PK-8)
- Bishop Ireton High School, Alexandria (9-12)
- Bishop O'Connell High School, Arlington (9–12)
- Browne Academy, Alexandria (PS-8)
- Burgundy Farm Country Day School, Alexandria (PS-8)
- Commonwealth Academy, Alexandria (6–12)
- Congressional School, Falls Church (PS-8)
- Episcopal High School, Alexandria (9–12)
- Flint Hill School, Oakton (PS-12)
- Grace Episcopal School, Alexandria (PS-5)
- Green Hedges School, Vienna (PS-8)
- GW Community School (9-12)
- Immanuel Christian School, Springfield (K-12)
- King Abdullah Academy (K-12)
- The Langley School, McLean (PS-8)
- Loudoun Country Day School, Leesburg (PS-8)
- Madeira School, McLean (9–12)
- Merritt Academy, Fairfax (PS-8)
- Metropolitan School of the Arts Academy, Lorton (7–12)
- Middleburg Academy, Middleburg (9–12)
- Montessori School of Northern Virginia, Annandale (PS-6)
- Oakwood School, Alexandria (K-8)
- Paul VI Catholic High School, Fairfax (9-12)
- Potomac School, McLean (K–12)
- Randolph-Macon Academy, Front Royal (6-12)
- The River Farm Cooperative, Alexandria (K–5)
- St. Stephens & St. Agnes School, Alexandria (PS-12)
- Trinity Christian School, Fairfax (K-12)
- Trinity School at Meadow View, Falls Church (6-12)
- Westminster School, Annandale (PK-8)

Former

- Islamic Saudi Academy (K-12)

== Catholic schools ==
The Roman Catholic Archdiocese of Washington (Catholic Schools) operates Catholic schools in DC and in Maryland suburbs. The Roman Catholic Diocese of Arlington operates Catholic schools in the Virginia suburbs.

=== Washington, D.C. ===
==== 6-12 schools ====
- St. Anselm's Abbey School (Saint Anselm's Abbey)

==== High schools (9–12) ====
- Archbishop Carroll High School
- Georgetown Preparatory School
- Georgetown Visitation Preparatory School (Georgetown Visitation Monastery)
- Gonzaga College High School
- St. John's College High School

==== K-8/PreK-8 schools ====
- Annuciation School
- Blessed Sacrament School
- Holy Trinity School (PK-8)
- Our Lady of Victory School (PreK3-8)
- Sacred Heart School
- St. Anthony's School
- St. Augustine Catholic School (PK-8)
- St. Francis Xavier Academy (PreK-8)
- St. Peter School (PK-8)
- St. Thomas More Catholic Academy (PK-8)

==== Middle schools (6-8) ====
- San Miguel School

==== 4-8 schools ====
- Washington Jesuit Academy

==== 3-8 schools ====
- Washington School for Girls

==== Former schools ====
- Holy Redeemer School (PS-8)
- Lt. Joseph P. Kennedy Institute (K–12)

=== Maryland ===
This list only includes schools under the Washington Archdiocese that are in Montgomery and Prince George's counties.

==== K-12 schools ====
- The Avalon School, Wheaton
- Brookewood School, Kensington

==== 1-12 schools ====
- Stone Ridge School of the Sacred Heart, Bethesda

==== 3-12 schools ====
- The Heights School, Potomac

==== 6-12 schools ====
- Connelly School of the Holy Child

==== High schools ====
- Academy of the Holy Cross
- Bishop McNamara High School
- DeMatha Catholic High School
- Don Bosco Cristo Rey High School
- Elizabeth Seton High School
- Our Lady of Good Counsel High School
- St. Vincent Pallotti High School

==== K-8/PreK-8 schools (Prince George's County) ====
- The Academy of Saint Matthias the Apostle (Lanham) (PreK-8)
- Holy Redeemer School (College Park) (PreK-8)
- Saint Ambrose School (Cheverly) (PreK-8)
- Saint Columba School (Oxon Hill) (PreK-8)
- Saint Jerome Academy (Hyattsville) (PreK-8)
- Saint John the Evangelist School (Clinton) (PreK-8)
- Saint Joseph Regional Catholic School (Beltsville) (PreK-8)
- Saint Mary of the Assumption School (near Upper Marlboro) (PreK-8)
- Saint Mary of the Mills School (Laurel)
- Saint Mary School (Landover Hills) (PreK-8)
- Saint Mary's School of Piscataway (Clinton)
- Saint Philip the Apostle School (Marlow Heights) (PreK-8)
- St. Pius X Regional School (Bowie) (PreK-8)

==== Others ====
- Holy Family School, Temple Hills (PS-8)
- Immaculate Conception School (PS-6)
- Mater Dei School, Bethesda (1–8)
- St. Philip The Apostle School, Suitland (PS-8)

=== Virginia ===
==== High schools ====
- Bishop Denis J. O'Connell High School
- Bishop Ireton High School
- John Paul the Great Catholic High School
- Oakcrest School
- Paul VI Catholic High School

== See also ==
- District of Columbia Public Schools
