= Association of Independent Schools of Greater Washington =

American nonprofit organizations

Coordinates: 38°54′34.1″N 77°4′9.9″W

The Association of Independent Schools of Greater Washington
- Abbreviation: AISGW
- Established: 1951
- Type: Non Governmental Organization
- Purpose: K–12 education
- Website: www.aisgw.org

The Association of Independent Schools of Greater Washington (AISGW) is an association of 75 independent schools located in the District of Columbia and metropolitan Washington, D.C. areas in Virginia and Maryland. More than 30,000 students attend these member schools in grades pre-K through high school.

Founded in 1951, AISGW member schools include co-ed schools as well as boys- and girls-only programs. Headquartered in Washington, D.C., with a staff of three full-time employees, AISGW serves as a resource for member schools and families seeking to learn more about independent education and the educational options provided by its member schools.

The mission of AISGW is to advance the collective interests of member schools in the capital region by promoting high professional standards and exemplary practices, encouraging cooperative endeavors, enhancing member schools' standing in the community, and safeguarding their independence.

== Programs ==
AISGW provides advocacy for its member schools, both on legislative and regulatory issues and to the public in advocating and communicating the benefits of an independent school education. The Association also provides tools for schools to use, opportunities for networking and professional development for administrators and school leaders, sponsors recruiting fairs, and provides educational benefits for member schools and their faculty and staff.

The Association manages a job bank where it lists open positions at its member schools and provides yearly statistical analysis of trends in enrollment, tuition, and other topics.

== Membership ==
Membership is available to independent, 501(c)(3) schools within the AISGW service area who have independent boards of trustees and independent finances, are accredited by a nationally recognized accrediting board (i.e. Virginia Association of Independent Schools, the National Association for the Education of Young Children, the Middle States Association of Colleges and Schools, the Association of Independent Schools of Maryland and DC, the Southern Association of Independent Schools, and have been in operation for 36 consecutive months. Provisional memberships are also available.

District of Columbia

- Aidan Montessori School
- Beauvoir, The National Cathedral Elementary School
- Bishop John T. Walker School For Boys
- Capitol Hill Day School
- Edmund Burke School
- The Field School
- Georgetown Day School
- Georgetown Visitation Preparatory School
- Gonzaga College High School
- The Lab School of Washington
- Lowell School
- Maret School
- Milton Gottesman Jewish Day School of the Nation's Capital
- National Cathedral School
- National Child Research Center
- National Presbyterian School
- Parkmont School
- The River School
- Sheridan School
- Sidwell Friends School
- St. Albans School
- St. Anselm's Abbey School
- St. Columba's Nursery School
- St. John's College High School
- St. Patrick's Episcopal Day School
- Washington International School
- Washington Jesuit Academy
- The Washington School For Girls

Maryland

- Alef Bet Montessori School
- The Academy of The Holy Cross
- Barrie School
- Bullis School
- Butler Montessori
- Charles E. Smith Jewish Day School
- Concord Hill School
- Connelly School of the Holy Child
- The Diener School
- Evergreen School
- Georgetown Preparatory School
- German International School Washington, DC
- Grace Episcopal Day School
- Green Acres School
- The Harbor School
- The Heights School
- Holton-Arms School
- Landon School
- Mater Dei School
- McLean School of Maryland
- The Nora School
- Norwood School
- The Primary Day School
- St. Andrew's Episcopal School
- Stone Ridge School of the Sacred Heart
- The Tidewater School
- Washington Episcopal School
- Washington Waldorf School
- The Woods Academy

Virginia

- Browne Academy
- Burgundy Farm Country Day School
- Commonwealth Academy
- The Congressional School of Virginia
- Episcopal High School
- Flint Hill School
- Foxcroft School
- Grace Episcopal School
- Green Hedges School
- The Hill School
- The Langley School
- Loudoun Country Day School
- The Madeira School
- Oakwood School
- The Potomac School
- St. Stephens & St. Agnes School
- Westminster School
