= Association of Independent Maryland and DC Schools =

American nonprofit education organization

The Association of Independent Maryland and DC Schools is an American nonprofit independent education organization representing 126 independent schools in the US state of Maryland and the District of Columbia. Based in Glen Burnie, Maryland, it was founded in 1967 as the Association of Independent Maryland Schools (AIMS) and is a member of the National Association of Independent Schools (NAIS) and the International Council Advancing Independent School Accreditation (ICAISA).

The Association provides accreditation services for its member schools as well as support for professional and institutional development. It also organizes regional employment Fairs, and it acts as a public advocate for the independence of its members from government regulation.

== Member schools ==
=== Anne Arundel County, Maryland ===
- Archbishop Spalding High School, Severn (9-12)
- Chesapeake Montessori School, Annapolis (PK-8)
- Indian Creek School, Crownsville (PK-12)
- The Key School, Annapolis (PK-12)
- Naval Academy Primary School, Annapolis (PK-5)
- Saint Andrew's United Methodist Day School, Edgewater (PK-8)
- St. Anne's School of Annapolis, Annapolis (PK-8)
- St. Martin's-in-the-Field Episcopal School (PK-8)
- Severn School, Arnold/Severna Park (PK-12)
- The Summit School, Edgewater (1-8)

=== Baltimore City, Maryland ===
- Baltimore Lab School (1-12)
- Boys' Latin School of Maryland (K-12)
- Bryn Mawr School (PK-12)
- Calvert School (PK-8)
- Catholic High School of Baltimore (9-12)
- The Community School (9-12)
- Cristo Rey Jesuit High School (9-12)
- Friends School of Baltimore (PK-12)
- Gilman School (PK-12)
- The GreenMount School (K-8)
- Mercy High School
- Mother Seton Academy (6-8)
- Mount Saint Joseph High School (9-12)
- Roland Park Country School (PK-12)
- St. Ignatius Loyola Academy (5-8)
- Sisters Academy of Baltimore (5-8)
- Waldorf School of Baltimore (PK-8)

=== Baltimore County, Maryland ===
- Beth Tfiloh Dahan Community School, Pikesville (PK-12)
- Calvert Hall College High School, Towson (9-12)
- Cambridge School, Towson (K-8)
- Concordia Preparatory School, Towson (6-12)
- Garrison Forest School, Owings Mills (PK-12)
- Greenspring Montessori School, Lutherville-Timonium (PK-9)
- Jemicy School, Owings Mills (1-12)
- Krieger Schechter Day School, Pikesville (K-8)
- Loyola Blakefield, Towson (6-12)
- Maryvale Preparatory School, Lutherville (6-12)
- McDonogh School, Owings Mills (PK-12)
- Notre Dame Preparatory School (6-12)
- The Odyssey School, Stevenson (K-8)
- Ohr Chadash Academy, Baltimore (PK-8)
- Oldfields School, Sparks Glencoe (8-12)
- Park School of Baltimore, Brooklandville (PK-12)
- St. James Academy, Monkton (PK-8)
- St. Paul's Schools, Brooklandville (K-12)
- St. Timothy's School, Stevenson (9-12)

=== Calvert County, Maryland ===
- Calverton School, Huntingtown (PK-12)

=== Carroll County, Maryland ===
- Gerstell Academy, Finksburg (PK-12)
- Montessori School of Westminster, Westminster (PK-9)

=== Frederick County, Maryland ===
- Friends Meeting School, Ijamsville (K-12)

=== Harford County, Maryland ===
- Harford Day School, Bel Air (PK-8)
- The Highlands School, Bel Air (K-12)
- The John Carroll School, Bel Air (9-12)

=== Howard County, Maryland ===
- Glenelg Country School, Ellicott City (PK-12)
- St. John's Parish Day School, Ellicott City (PK-5)
- Trinity School, Ellicott City (PK-8)

=== Kent County, Maryland ===
- Kent School, Chestertown (PK-8)
- Radcliffe Creek School, Chestertown (PK-8)

=== Montgomery County, Maryland ===
- Academy of the Holy Cross, Kensington (9-12)
- Alef Bet Montessori School, Bethesda (PK/K)
- Barnesville School of Arts & Sciences, Barnesville (PK-8)
- Barrie School, Silver Spring (PK-12)
- Bullis School, Potomac (K-12)
- Charles E. Smith Jewish Day School, Rockville (PK-12)
- Christ Episcopal School, Rockville (PK-8)
- Concord Hill School, Chevy Chase (PK-3)
- Connelly School of the Holy Child, Potomac (6-12)
- Diener School, Bethesda (K-8)
- Evergreen School, Silver Spring (PK-3)
- Georgetown Preparatory School, North Bethesda (9-12)
- Grace Episcopal Day School, Kensington (PK-5)
- Green Acres School, North Bethesda (PK-8)
- The Harbor School, Bethesda (PK-2)
- Holton-Arms School, Bethesda (3-12)
- Landon School, Bethesda (3-12)
- Mater Dei School, Bethesda (1-8)
- McLean School of Maryland, Potomac (K-12)
- Norwood School, Bethesda (PK-8)
- Our Lady of Good Counsel High School, Olney (9-12)
- The Primary Day School, Bethesda (PK-2)
- Rochambeau French International School, Bethesda (PK-12)
- St. Andrew's Episcopal School, Potomac (PK-12)
- St. John's Episcopal School, Olney (PK-8)
- Sandy Spring Friends School, Sandy Spring (PK-12)
- Seneca Academy and Circle School, Darnestown (PK-5)
- Sidwell Friends School (Lower School), Bethesda (PK-5)
- Stone Ridge School of the Sacred Heart, Bethesda (PK-12)
- Washington Episcopal School, Bethesda (PK-8)
- Washington Waldorf School, Bethesda (PK-12)
- The Woods Academy, Bethesda (PK-8)

=== Prince George's County, Maryland ===
- Friends Community School, College Park (K-8)
- Holy Trinity School, Glenn Dale/Bowie (PK-8)
- St. Vincent Pallotti High School, Laurel (9-12)

=== Queen Anne's County, Maryland ===
- The Gunston School, Centreville (9-12)
- Wye River Upper School, Centreville (9-12)

=== Talbot County, Maryland ===
- The Country School, Easton (PK-8)

=== Worcester County, Maryland ===
- Worcester Preparatory School, Berlin (PK-12)

=== Washington DC ===
- Aidan Montessori School (PK-6)
- Beauvoir School (PK-3)
- Capitol Hill Day School (PK-8)
- Edmund Burke School (6-12)
- Georgetown Day School (PK-12)
- Gonzaga College High School (9-12)
- Lab School of Washington (1-12)
- Lowell School (PK-8)
- Maret School (K-12)
- Milton Gottesman Jewish Day School of the Nation's Capital (PK-8)
- MYSA School (K-12)
- National Cathedral School (4-12)
- National Presbyterian School (PK-6)
- Parkmont School (6-12)
- The River School (PK-3)
- St. Albans School (4-12)
- St. Anselm's Abbey School (6-12)
- St. Patrick's Episcopal Day School (PK-8)
- Sheridan School (K-8)
- Sidwell Friends School (Middle/Upper School) (6-12)
- Washington Jesuit Academy (4-8)
