= Washington Jesuit Academy =

Middle school in Washington, DC, US

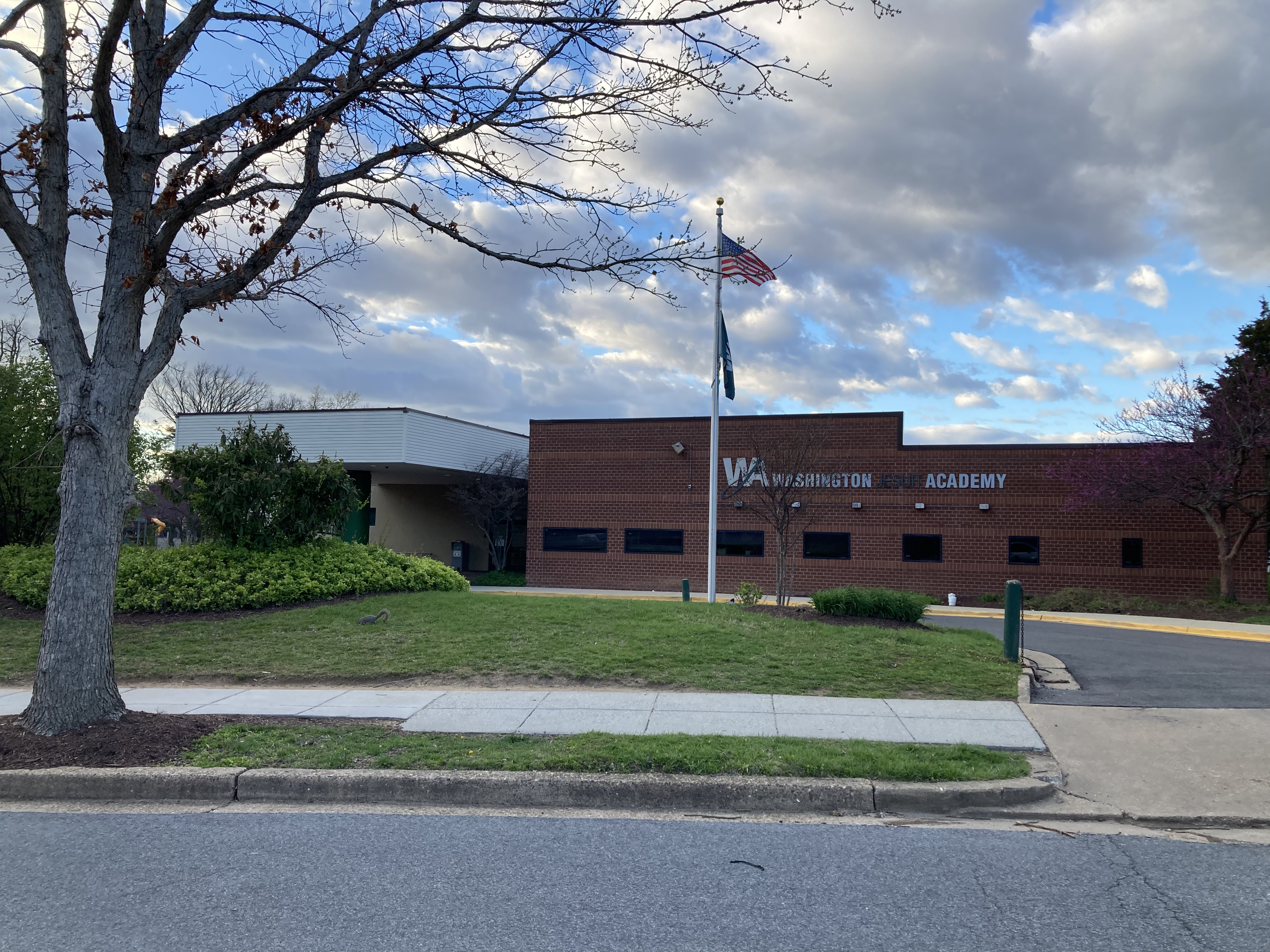

Location
- 900 Varnum Street NE; Washington, DC 20017; United States
- Coordinates: 38°56′36″N 76°59′37″W

Information
- Type: Middle School
- Religious affiliation: Catholic
- Established: 2002; 24 years ago
- President: Marcus Washington
- Principal: Brian Farmer
- Teaching staff: 17.0 (FTE) (2023–24)
- Grades: Grade 4–Grade 8
- Enrollment: 138 (2023–24)
- Student to teacher ratio: 8.1 (2023–24)
- Colors: Green & Black
- Team name: Jaguars
- Affiliations: National Catholic Educational Association (NCEA); Association of Independent Schools of Greater Washington (AISGW); Association of Independent Maryland and DC Schools (AIMS/MD & DC)
- Website: wjacademy.org

Washington Jesuit Academy (WJA) is an independent, Catholic school in Washington, D.C., U.S.

== History ==
Washington Jesuit Academy was founded in 2002 by the Society of Jesus to provide educational opportunities for boys from underserved communities in Washington, D.C.

== Organization and curriculum ==
WJA is a tuition-free middle school for boys in grades 4 through 8, with an enrollment of, as of the 2023–24 school year, 138 students. Students follow a curriculum in core subjects including English, mathematics, science, social studies, and Spanish. They also receive instruction in arts, athletics, and character development programs.

== Governance ==
As of November 2025 Marcus Washington is the president of WJA, succeeding founding president Bill Whitaker in 2022. He oversees all of WJA's different departments, and delegates responsibilities. Brian Farmer is the principal. He transitioned into that role after a prior career in law and earning a M.Ed.

== Affiliations ==
WJA is affiliated with the following organizations:

- National Catholic Educational Association – Private, professional educational membership association
- Association of Independent Maryland & DC Schools – American nonprofit education organization
- Association of Independent Schools of Greater Washington – American nonprofit organizations

== Notable people ==
- Kevin Winston Jr., professional NFL player for the Tennessee Titans.
- Rakim Jarrett, former NFL player.
