= WJA =

WJA or wja may refer to:

== Codes ==
- WJA, the ICAO code for WestJet, Alberta, Canada
- WJA, the IATA code for Woja Airport, Ailinglaplap Atoll, Marshall Islands
- wja, the ISO 639-3 code for Waja language, eastern Nigeria

== Organisations ==
- Washington Jesuit Academy, a middle school in Washington, D.C., US
- Welsh Judo Association, the governing body for the sport of judo in Wales, UK
- World Jurist Association, an NGO based in the US focused on strengthening the rule of law globally
