= Potomac, Maryland =

- Census-designated place
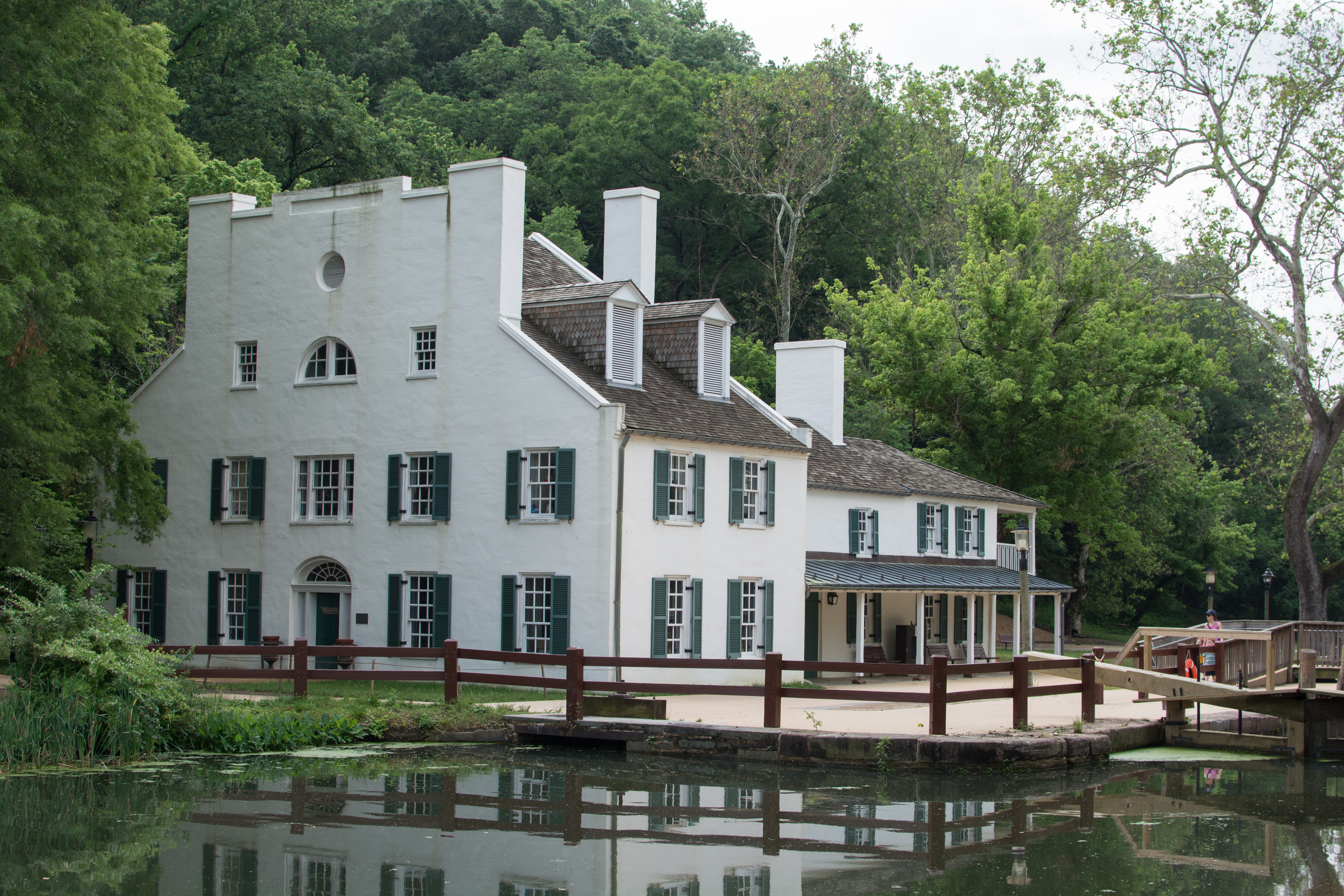
- Great Falls Tavern

- Location of Potomac in Maryland
- Coordinates: 39°00′12″N 77°12′20″W
- Country: United States
- State: Maryland
- County: Montgomery
- First settled: 1714; 312 years ago

Area
  - Total: 26.58 sq mi (68.85 km^{2})
  - Land: 25.14 sq mi (65.12 km^{2})
  - Water: 1.44 sq mi (3.73 km^{2})
- Elevation: 292 ft (89 m)

Population (2020)
  - Total: 47,018
  - Density: 1,869.9/sq mi (721.99/km^{2})
- Time zone: UTC−5 (Eastern (EST))
  - Summer (DST): UTC−4 (EDT)
- ZIP Codes: 20854, 20859
- Area codes: 301, 240
- FIPS code: 24-63300
- GNIS feature ID: 2389701

Potomac (/pəˈtoʊmək/) is an unincorporated community and census-designated place in Montgomery County, Maryland, United States. As of the 2020 census, it had a population of 47,018. It is named after the nearby Potomac River. A part of the Washington metropolitan area, many Potomac residents work in nearby Washington, D.C., and Northern Virginia.

== History ==
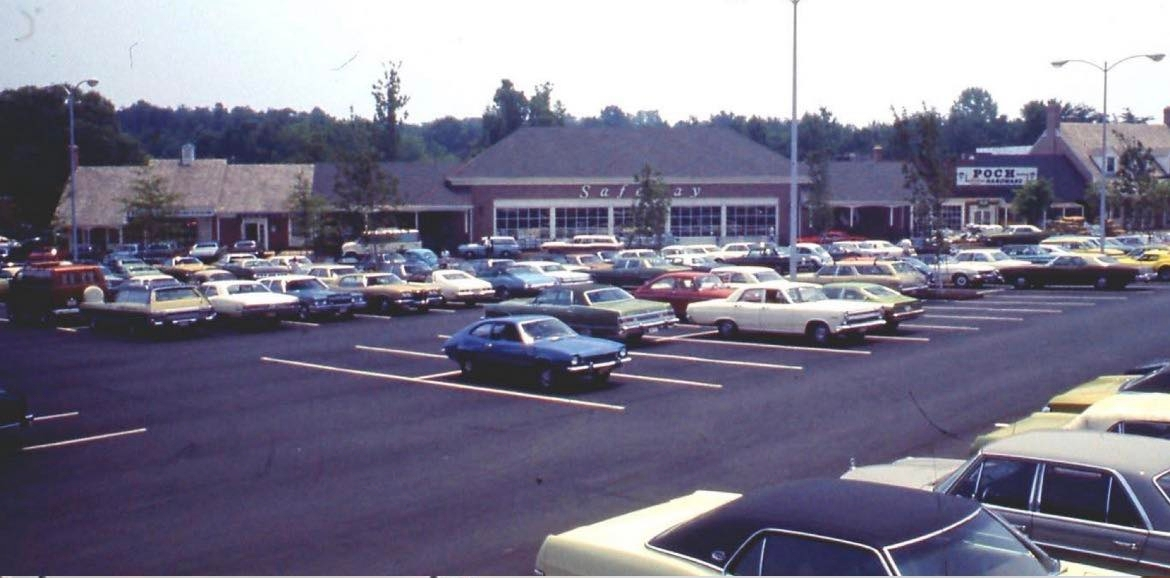
Potomac's River Road in 1972

The land that is now Potomac was first settled by Edward Offutt in 1714 after he was granted a 600-acre (2.4 km^{2}) land grant of a region known as Clewerwell by Lord Baltimore. His grant of land was by the Tehogee Indian Trail, an Indian trade route built by the Canaze Native American nation in 1716. Throughout the 18th century, what became known as "Offutts Crossroads" was a small, rural community which served planters and travelers. In the 19th century, a few small dwellings had been built along with a tavern established in 1820. By the time of the Civil War, the community contained two general stores, a blacksmith shop, and a post office which served a community of 100.

Offutts Crossroads was renamed "Potomac" in 1881 by John McDonald. An Irishman and veteran of the Civil War, McDonald settled in Potomac around that time. He petitioned for the name change since postal officials were asking for brief names and there were already several other communities in the area with the name "crossroads".

By the turn of the 20th century, Potomac was growing. Thomas Perry, an operator of a nearby general store, built a house on the corner of Falls and River Roads in 1902. More residential structures were built on the northern section of Falls Road throughout the 1920s and 1930s. During the 1950s, Potomac was one of many communities in Montgomery County to experience suburbanization because of its proximity to Washington, D.C. Potomac quickly transformed from a rural farming community to a suburban community from the mid- to late 20th century.

Numerous original buildings within Potomac Village have been demolished for the construction of strip malls and modern office buildings. However, in the surrounding area, many of the old farmhouses remain, though some are confined within suburban developments. The Perry Store has been restored and still stands as part of a bank, although the building was moved 21 feet in 1986 to allow for a project to widen the intersection of Falls and River Roads.

== Geography ==
Potomac's geographical focal point is Potomac Village, a small cluster of shops and businesses at the intersection of Maryland State Highway 189 (Falls Road) and Maryland State Highway 190 (River Road) northwest of Washington, D.C.

According to the U.S. Census Bureau, Potomac has a total area of 26.6 square miles (69 km^{2}), of which 25.2 square miles (65 km^{2}) are land and 1.4 square miles (3.6 km^{2}), or 5.33%, are water. It includes the ZIP Code 20854 for properties and 20859 for US Post Office Boxes.

=== Climate ===
The climate is characterized by hot, humid summers and generally cool to cold winters with light to medium snow. According to the Köppen climate classification system, Potomac has a humid subtropical climate, abbreviated "Cfa" on climate maps.

== Demographics ==
Historical population
| Census | Pop. | Note | %± |
|---|---|---|---|
| 1980 | 40,401 | | — |
| 1990 | 45,634 | | 13.0% |
| 2000 | 46,255 | | 1.4% |
| 2010 | 44,965 | | −2.8% |
| 2020 | 47,018 | | 4.6% |
source: 2010–2020

=== 2020 census ===
As of the 2020 census, Potomac had a population of 47,018 and a population density of 1,871.2 inhabitants per square mile (722.5/km^{2}). The median age was 47.4 years. 23.4% of residents were under the age of 18 and 23.5% were 65 years of age or older. For every 100 females there were 91.9 males, and for every 100 females age 18 and over there were 88.3 males age 18 and over.

97.9% of residents lived in urban areas, while 2.1% lived in rural areas.

There were 16,537 households in Potomac, of which 36.3% had children under the age of 18 living in them. Of all households, 69.4% were married-couple households, 8.7% were households with a male householder and no spouse or partner present, and 19.8% were households with a female householder and no spouse or partner present. About 17.1% of all households were made up of individuals and 10.4% had someone living alone who was 65 years of age or older.

There were 17,197 housing units, of which 3.8% were vacant. The homeowner vacancy rate was 0.8% and the rental vacancy rate was 3.8%.

Racial composition as of the 2020 census
| Race | Number | Percent |
|---|---|---|
| White | 28,492 | 60.6% |
| Black or African American | 2,762 | 5.9% |
| American Indian and Alaska Native | 53 | 0.1% |
| Asian | 10,468 | 22.3% |
| Native Hawaiian and Other Pacific Islander | 14 | 0.0% |
| Some other race | 782 | 1.7% |
| Two or more races | 4,447 | 9.5% |
| Hispanic or Latino (of any race) | 3,580 | 7.6% |

=== 2010 census ===
As of the 2010 census, there were 16,642 housing units at an average density of 633.9 per square mile (244.8/km^{2}). Of the 16,316 households, 38.4% included children under the age of 18, 74.8% were married couples living together, 6.6% had a female householder and 16.8% were non-families. Fourteen percent of all households were made up of individuals, and 5.9% were persons living alone who were 65 or older. The average household size was 2.84 and the average family size was 3.10.

In Potomac, the age distribution was 23.3% under the age of 18, 4.6% from 18 to 24, 21.3% from 25 to 44, 34.0% from 45 to 64 and 24.2% who were 65 or older. The median age was 44. For every 100 females, there were 91.6 males. For every 100 females 18 or older, there were 87.3 males.

=== Other estimates ===
A 2017 ACS 5-Year Population Estimate cited 45,780 people living in Potomac.

In 2026, the median property value in Potomac, MD was $1,016,000, and the homeownership rate was 84.8%.

=== Income ===
The median income for a household in the CDP was $236,675 in 2024. Men had a median income of more than $100,000; women, $78,442. About 2.5% of families and 3.9% of the population were below the poverty line, including 3.6% of those under the age of 18 and 3.6% of those 65 and older.

== Arts and culture ==
Potomac has a branch of the Montgomery County Public Libraries.

The monthly Potomac Almanac, a newspaper founded by Beppie Noyes in 1957, covers the community.

Potomac is known for being one of the best lacrosse areas in the United States with many of the area's schools and travel club teams competing at top tier levels. Those schools include Bullis School, The Heights School, and St. Andrew's Episcopal School.

Potomac has an eruv serving its Jewish community. Enclosing 24 subdivisions and approximately 5,323 homes, it uses utility lines, highway fences, and natural features to permit carrying items and pushing strollers on Shabbat within its boundary.

== Education ==
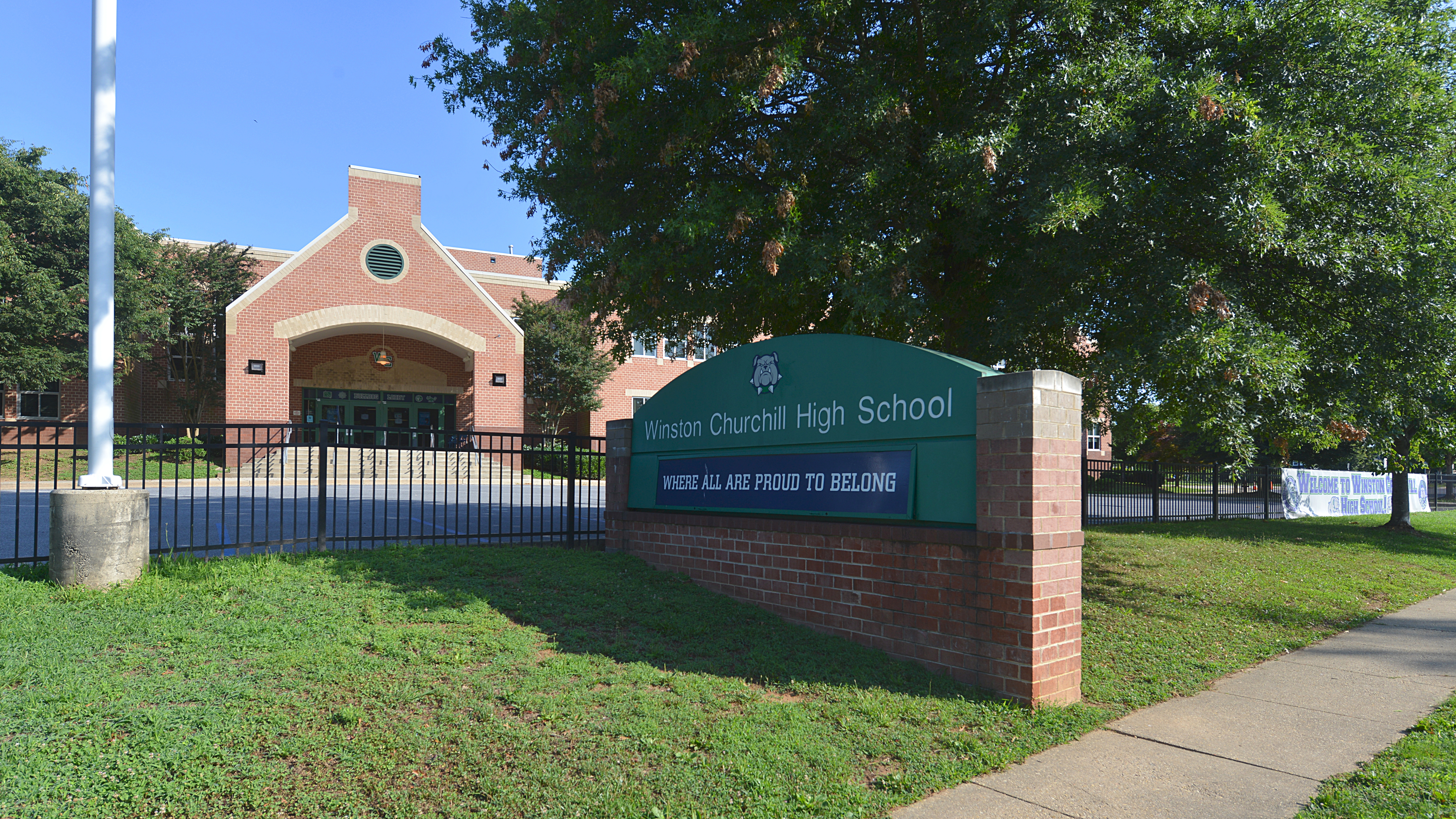
Winston Churchill High School

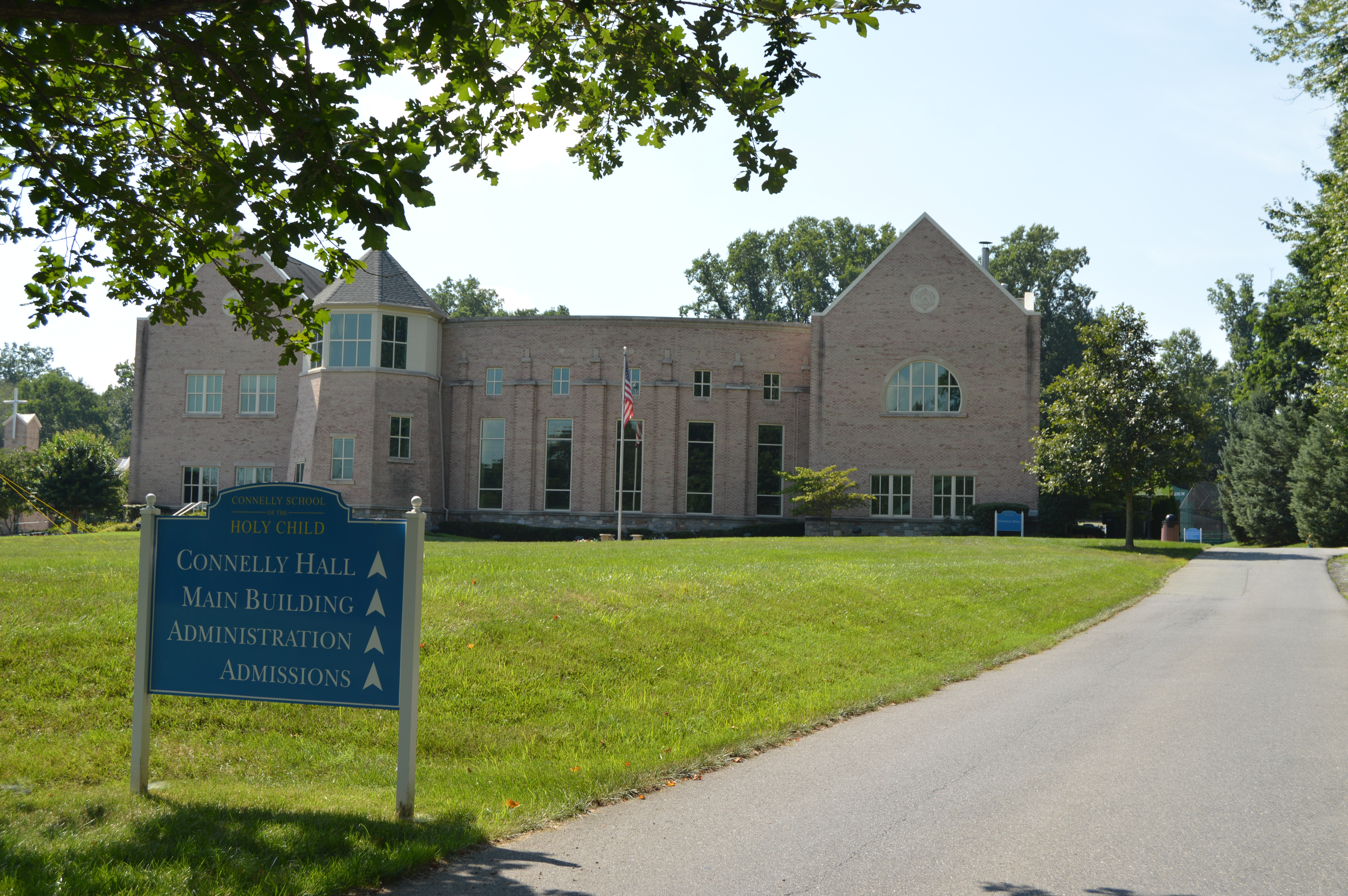
Connelly School of the Holy Child

=== Public schools ===
Schools operated by Montgomery County Public Schools in Potomac include:

- Bells Mill Elementary
- Beverly Farms Elementary
- Cabin John Middle School
- Cold Spring Elementary
- Herbert Hoover Middle School
- Potomac Elementary
- Stone Mill Elementary
- Travilah Elementary
- Wayside Elementary
- Winston Churchill High School

=== Private schools ===
- Bullis School
- German School Washington, D.C.
- McLean School of Maryland
- Norwood School
- The Harbor School

=== Religious schools ===
- Connelly School of the Holy Child
- Our Lady of Mercy Catholic School
- St. Andrew's Episcopal School
- The Heights School

== In popular culture ==
- In 2016, the television show The Real Housewives of Potomac premiered, chronicling the lives of two Potomac housewives and four women from neighboring towns. Some residents disputed its portrayal in the show.
- Darren Star created the television series Beverly Hills, 90210 based on his experience as a student at Winston Churchill High School in Potomac.
