= Waldorf School of Baltimore =

Private school in Baltimore, Maryland, US

- Cold Spring Newtown community, Baltimore, Maryland; United States

Information
- Type: Co-ed, Private, Waldorf school
- Established: 1971
- Website: Official website

The Waldorf School of Baltimore is a private, co-education, school that was established in 1971 under the name New Morning School. It is located in the Cold Spring Newtown community, Baltimore, Maryland. It adopted the Waldorf curriculum in 1972 and now offers Parent/Child classes for infants and toddlers, a Nursery and Kindergarten program and Grades 1-8. It is also one of Maryland's green schools.

== Curriculum ==
The school follows a standard Waldorf curriculum model which includes putting less emphasis on standardized testing, and a later introduction of technology-related teaching tools.

== Licensing ==
The Waldorf School of Baltimore is licensed by the Maryland State Board of Education, is an accredited member of the Association of Independent Maryland Schools (AIMS), and is also accredited by the Waldorf Early Childhood Association of North America and the Association of Waldorf Schools of North America (AWSNA).

== See also ==
- Curriculum of the Waldorf schools
