= North Cleveland Park =

- Neighborhood of Washington, D.C.
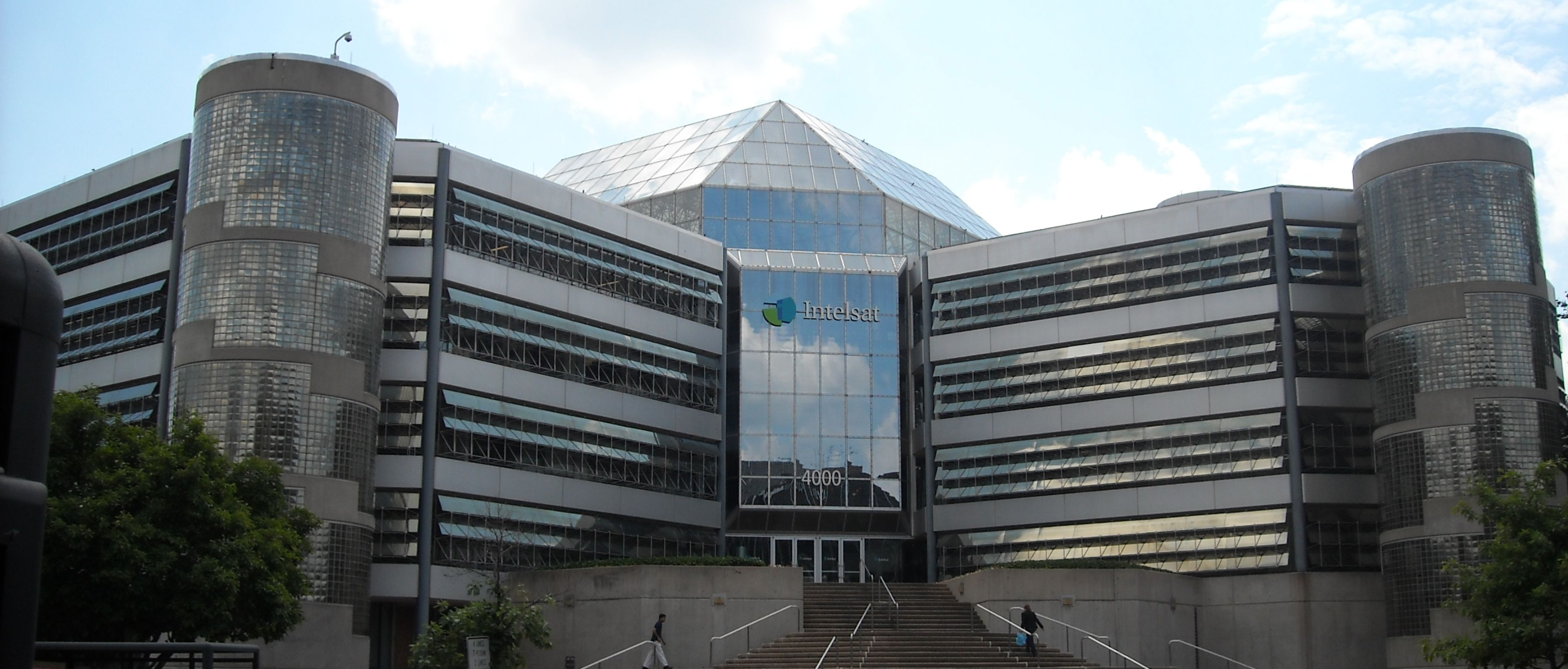
- Intelsat headquarters (2008)

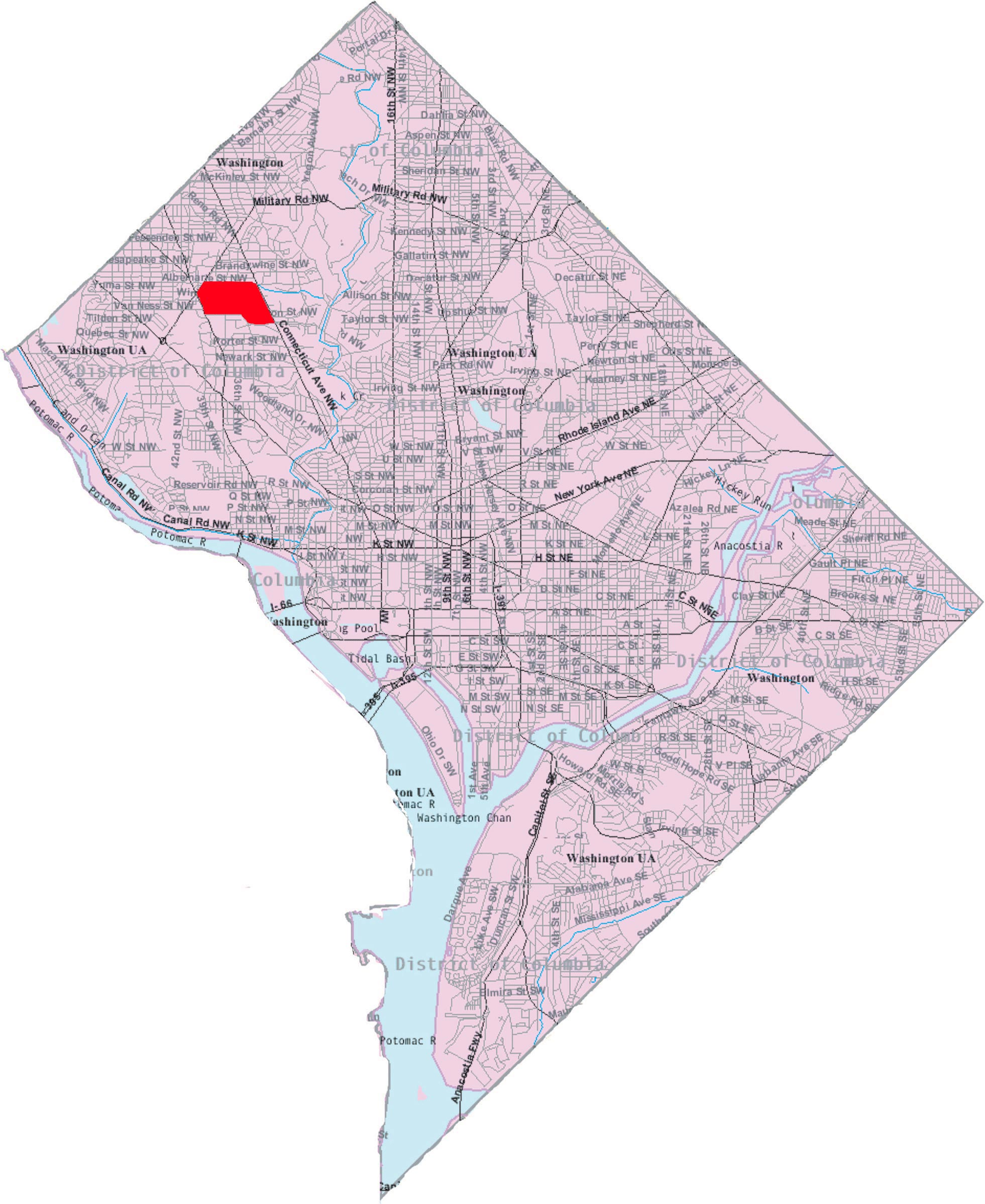
- Map of Washington, D.C., with North Cleveland Park highlighted in red
- Coordinates: 38.9497°N 77.09°W
- Country: United States
- District: Washington, D.C.
- Ward: Ward 3

Government
  - Councilmember: Matthew Frumin
- Postal code: ZIP code

North Cleveland Park is a neighborhood in the Northwest quadrant of Washington, D.C.

It is bounded by Albemarle Street NW to the north, Rodman and Quebec Streets NW to the south, Wisconsin and Nebraska Avenues NW to the west, and Connecticut Avenue to the east. It is served by the Van Ness–UDC station on the Washington Metro's Red Line, and is therefore — like the adjacent Forest Hills neighborhood — frequently referred to as Van Ness.

North Cleveland Park should not be confused with the neighboring Cleveland Park to its south: although both are part of the original tract of land on which President Grover Cleveland built his summer estate in the 1880s, they are separate neighborhoods.

The neighborhood is home to the Van Ness campus of the University of the District of Columbia, the former headquarters of Intelsat, Sidwell Friends School, Sheridan School and several embassies, including those of Austria, Bahrain, Bangladesh, Brunei, China, Egypt, Ethiopia, Ghana, Honduras, Israel, Jordan, Kuwait, Malaysia, Monaco, Morocco (future site), Nigeria, Pakistan, Singapore, Slovakia and the United Arab Emirates. Many of these embassies are located within the International Chancery Center, the former site of the National Bureau of Standards.

== See also ==
- Grant Road Historic District
