= St. Patrick's Episcopal Church (Washington, D.C.) =

Coordinates: 38°54′58″N 77°5′27.6″W

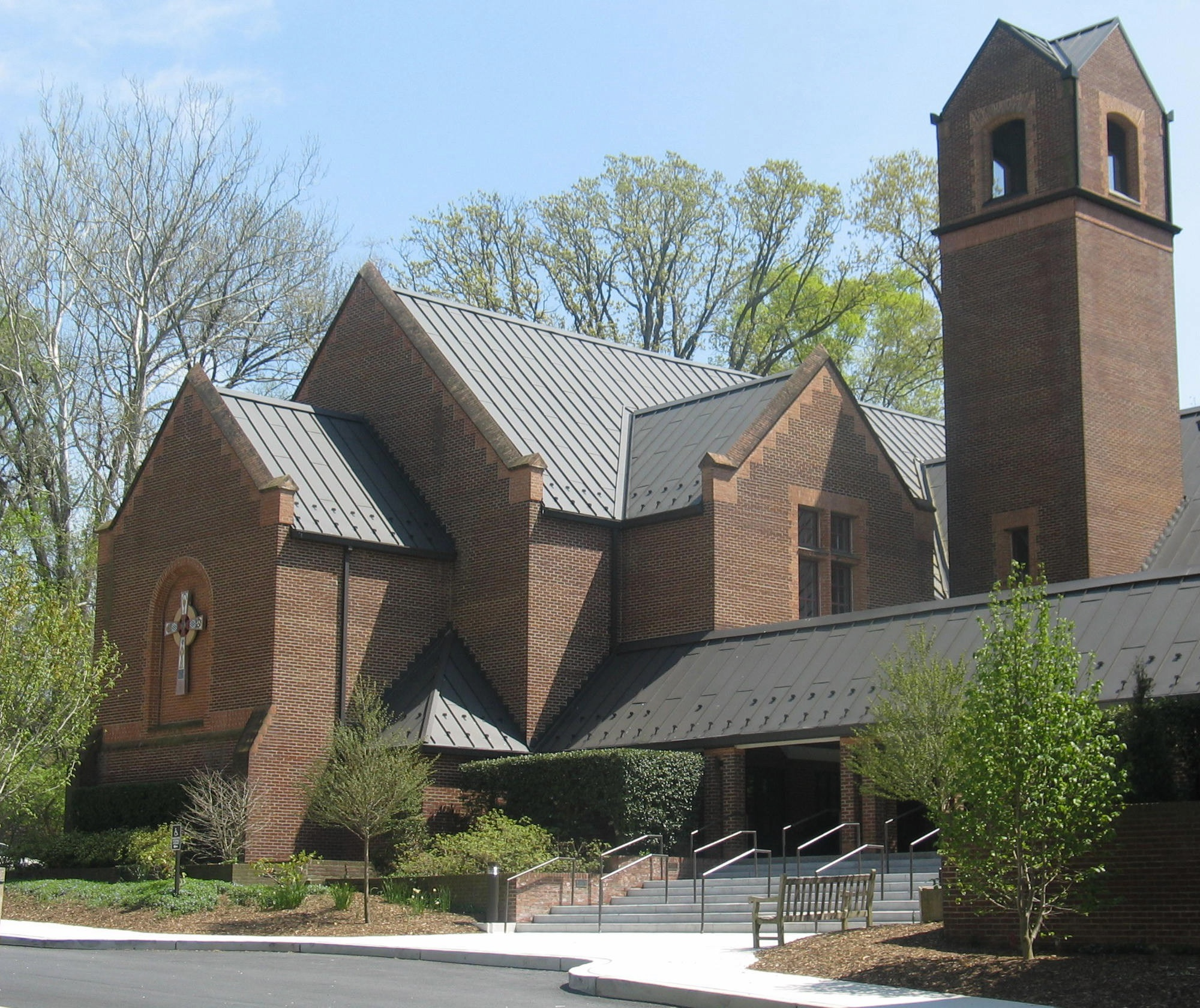
- St. Patrick's Church in 2011.
- St. Patrick's Episcopal Church
- Denomination: Episcopal Church

History
- Founded: 1911
- Dedication: 1914

Architecture
- Years built: 1985
- Construction cost: US$3.5 million

Clergy
- Rector: The Rev. Andrew Ogletree

St. Patrick's Episcopal Church is an Episcopal church located in the Palisades neighborhood of Washington, D.C. It is a parish of the Episcopal Diocese of Washington. The church reported 419 members in 2020 and 372 members in 2023; no membership statistics were reported in 2024 parochial reports. Plate and pledge income reported for the congregation in 2024 was $568,183. Average Sunday attendance (ASA) in 2024 was 80 persons.

== History ==
Founded in 1911 as the fifth and last mission chapel of St. Alban's Parish, St. Patrick's became an independent Parish in 1946. It was the first Protestant church in the Western Hemisphere named after Saint Patrick.

St. Patrick's first worship service was held on October 22, 1911 in a house at 22 Foxhall Road, NW. The first dedicated worship space was completed in 1914 at the terminus of Greenwich Parkway at Foxhall Rd. It was razed in 1935 due to street widening. A new site across Foxhall Rd. at Reservoir was completed in 1936. A larger worship space was added adjacent to the existing structure in 1954 and the 1936 building was converted into Warren Hall (in honor of the 1st Rector) to serve as parish meeting space. The site was sold to developers in 1985 when the church moved to its present location on Whitehaven Parkway between Foxhall and MacArthur (four blocks north of Foxhall and Reservoir). The Most Rev. Frank Griswold, the 25th Presiding Bishop of the Episcopal Church, USA, led Centennial celebrations at St. Patrick's on October 30, 2011.

=== Civil rights and urban mission ===
St. Patrick's hired an African-American, the Rev. Jesse F. Anderson, Jr., to serve as an associate priest in the midst of the Civil Rights Movement. The Rev. Thomas D. Bowers, the fourth Rector of St. Patrick's, called him to serve the parish in 1966. When Anderson's appointment was announced at a Sunday morning worship service, approximately fifty families quit their membership, some of them walking out during the announcement. Bowers remembered that moment as a pivotal turn in the history of St. Patrick's because "new people began to pour into our church (St. Patrick's) with a different view of what church should be and our life together was changed forever." Anderson was called to fulfill a vision that St. Patrick's be "involved in the newly emerging America that recognized and accepted its racial, national, and 'gender' minorities."

The Rev. Anderson founded St. Patrick's Southeast Enrichment Center located at 8th and I (Eye) Streets, SE to offer community services like tutoring with local schools, food, and clothing. The money for the creation of the program came from designated outreach funds of the capital campaign to renovate the church building in 1965. The center was destroyed by fire on April 5, 1968 during the riots following the assassination of Martin Luther King, Jr. Earlier on that same day (April 5, 1968), Ronald Reagan, then Governor of California, visited the Southeast Enrichment Center for about 45 minutes. After the fire, the Southeast Enrichment Center programs moved to 729 Eighth Street, SE (just three doors north). Black Coats, Inc., a carpet cleaning company, was a job creation and entrepreneurial opportunity program supported by the St. Patrick's Southeast Enrichment Center. Cleveland A. Barnes was an employee of Black Coats, and through that relationship came to serve St. Patrick's as sexton in 1974.

In 1972, The Rev. Jesse F. Anderson, Jr. followed a call to serve as Vicar of St. Phillip's Episcopal Church in SE Washington, D.C. Several decades later, St. Patrick's continues to supply food for the food pantry at St. Phillip's as a result of Anderson building a bridge between the two churches.

== Leadership ==
The Parish is led by the Vestry, an elected group of lay leaders, who elect a Rector, a member of the Episcopal clergy, to chair the Vestry, serve as the spiritual leader of the congregation, and manage the day-to-day operations of the Parish's ministries. Every year, the Parish selects leaders to serve as Senior and Junior Wardens and representatives of the Vestry at an annual meeting in early November (the meeting must be held in November prior to the 15th of the month). The Vestry is transitioning to a body of twelve lay members and the Rector for a total of at least 13 members and no more than 15. This transition is a result of bylaw amendments that passed at a vote of the Parish on September 18, 2011. The lay officers of the Vestry are Senior Warden, Junior Warden for the Church, Junior Warden for the Day School, Treasurer, and Clerk who serve one-year terms. Three vestry representatives are elected every year to serve two-year terms. The current Rector is the Andrew Ogletree and Senior Warden is Jo Anne Nelson.

=== List of rectors ===
1. The Rev. F. Ernest Warren (1946 – 1949)
2. The Rev. John F. Stevens (1949 – 1955)
3. The Rev. William R. Williams (1955 – 1960)
4. The Rev. Thomas D. Bowers (1961 – 1971)
5. The Rev. Christopher R. Sherrill (1972 – 1979)
6. The Rev. S. James Steen (1979 – 1992)
7. The Rev. Elizabeth S. McWhorter (1995 – 2007)
8. The Rev. Kurt J. Gerhard (2010 – 2022)
9. The Rev. Andrew W. Ogletree (2023 - Present)

== Facilities ==
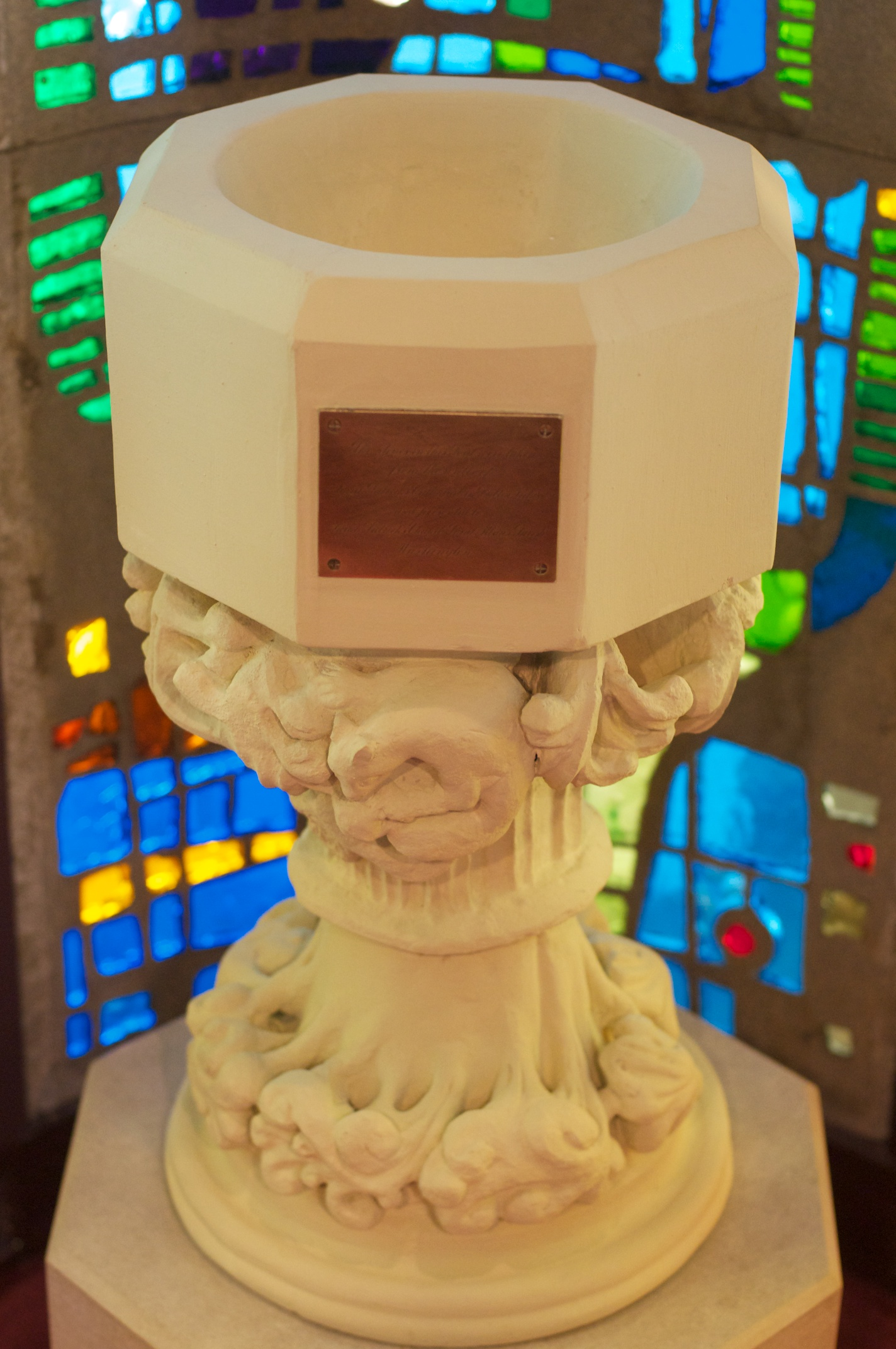
Renovated Baptismal Font, October 30, 2011

The current worship space and Parish offices of St. Patrick's were dedicated in 1985. The building was built adjacent to the elementary classrooms of St. Patrick's Episcopal Day School. The building was designed by Hartman-Cox Architects, a DC firm. In order to match the Palisades neighborhood, the architects broke down the structure into an "abundance of small, gabled brick shapes." The cost of the Church building was $3.5 million. The interior furniture of the worship space was replaced in preparation for the 2011 Centennial celebrations. Most notably, the original 1985 black sanctuary chairs were replaced with natural wood chairs and the altar, and chancel chairs were refinished. The old chairs were donated to a church in Flint, Michigan. The new chairs were dedicated on October 16, 2011. The Great Hall is a multi-purpose room that can, when needed, be used to expand the seating capacity of the worship space.

=== Baptismal font ===
After St. Patrick's was founded in 1911 as the first Protestant church named after the patron saint of Ireland in the United States, the Rector of St. Alban's with the help of Bishop Harding wrote to Charles T. Ovendon, D.D., Dean of St. Patrick's Cathedral in Dublin, Ireland, asking if "stones could be procured from that historic temple wherewith to make a Font for little American St. Patrick's Chapel." The Dean sent four 700-year-old stones from the edifice of the Cathedral that were created into a font using funds collected from children of St. Patrick's. It was completed and dedicated in 1920 to the late Lottie Stewart Ellis (1885–1918) who was the long time Directress of the Font Roll. The total cost for the creation of the font was $125. The font fell and broke in the mid-1980s after which it was unused and stored in the entrance courtyard. In preparation for the Centennial, the font was renovated for rededication by Bishop Frank Griswold at the Centennial Eucharist on October 30, 2011. At the following Sunday's All Saints' remembrance (November 6, 2011), the font was used for four baptisms.

== St. Patrick's Day School ==
St. Patrick's founded a Day School in 1956 using extra space made available with the construction of new facilities. Originally a preschool and kindergarten, the Day School expanded through the elementary grades in the 1960s and through middle school in 2002. The school is co-educational and is a member of the National Association of Episcopal Schools.
