= Kevin Winston Jr. =

American football player (born 2003)

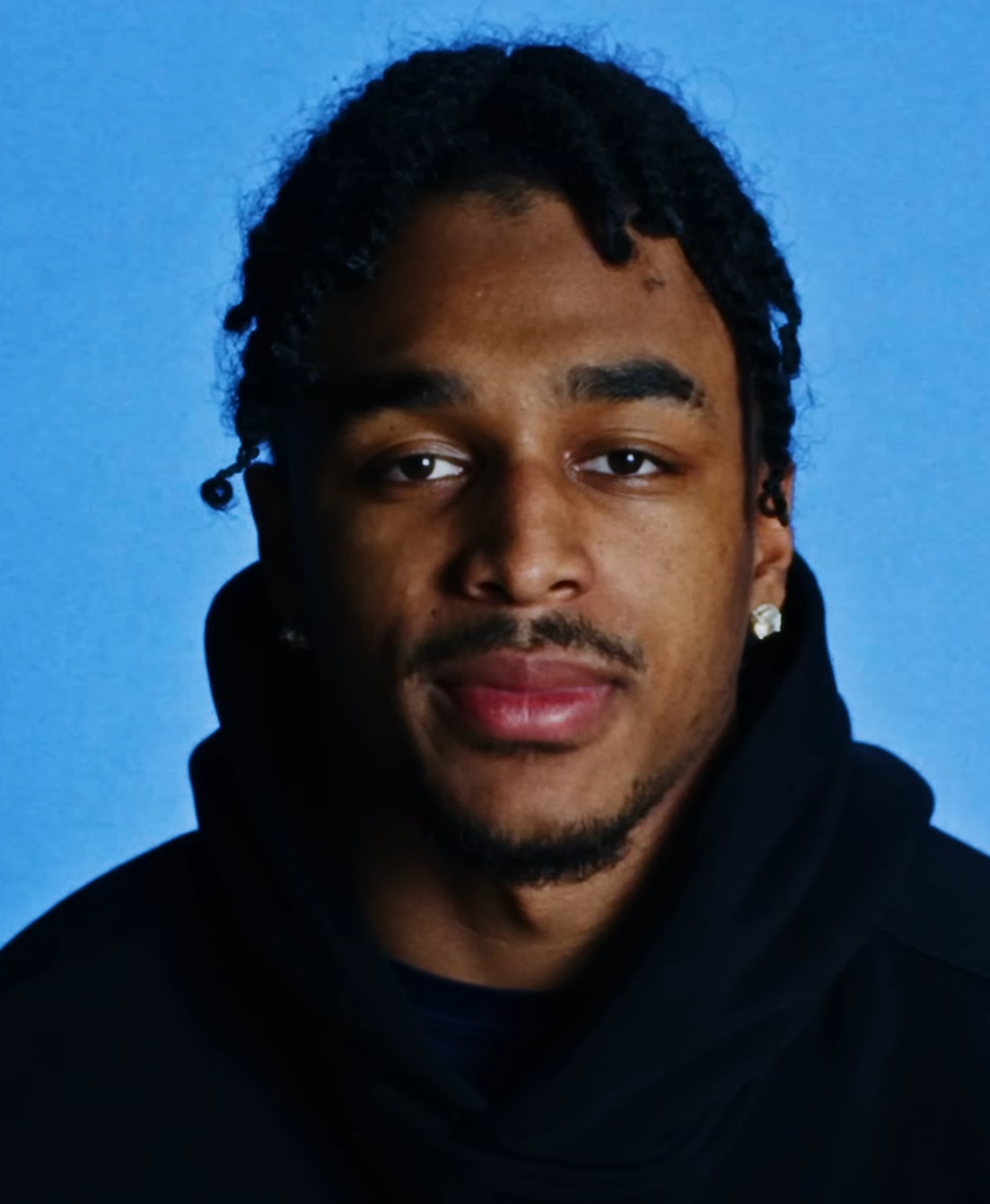
- Winston in 2025

No. 23 – Tennessee Titans
- Position: Safety
- Roster status: Active

Personal information
- Born: December 2, 2003 (age 22); Cheverly, Maryland, U.S.
- Listed height: 6 ft 2 in (1.88 m)
- Listed weight: 213 lb (97 kg)

Career information
- High school: DeMatha Catholic (Hyattsville, Maryland)
- College: Penn State (2022–2024)
- NFL draft: 2025: 3rd round, 82nd overall pick

Career history
- Tennessee Titans (2025–present)

Career NFL statistics as of 2025
- Total tackles: 34
- Sacks: 1
- Pass deflections: 2
- Stats at Pro Football Reference

Kevin Dwayne Winston Jr. (born December 2, 2003) is an American professional football safety for the Tennessee Titans of the National Football League (NFL). He played college football for the Penn State Nittany Lions and was selected by the Titans in the third round of the 2025 NFL draft.

== Early life ==
Kevin Winston Jr. attended middle school at Washington Jesuit Academy in Washington, D.C., where his father is the vice principal. His father, Kevin Winston Sr. played football at James Madison University for four seasons, winning a National Championship in 2004. Winston Jr. attended DeMatha Catholic High School in Hyattsville, Maryland. As a senior in 2021, he was named the All-Met Defensive Player Player of the Year by The Washington Post after recording 50 tackles, three interceptions and a fumble recovery for a touchdown. He committed to Penn State University to play college football.

== College career ==
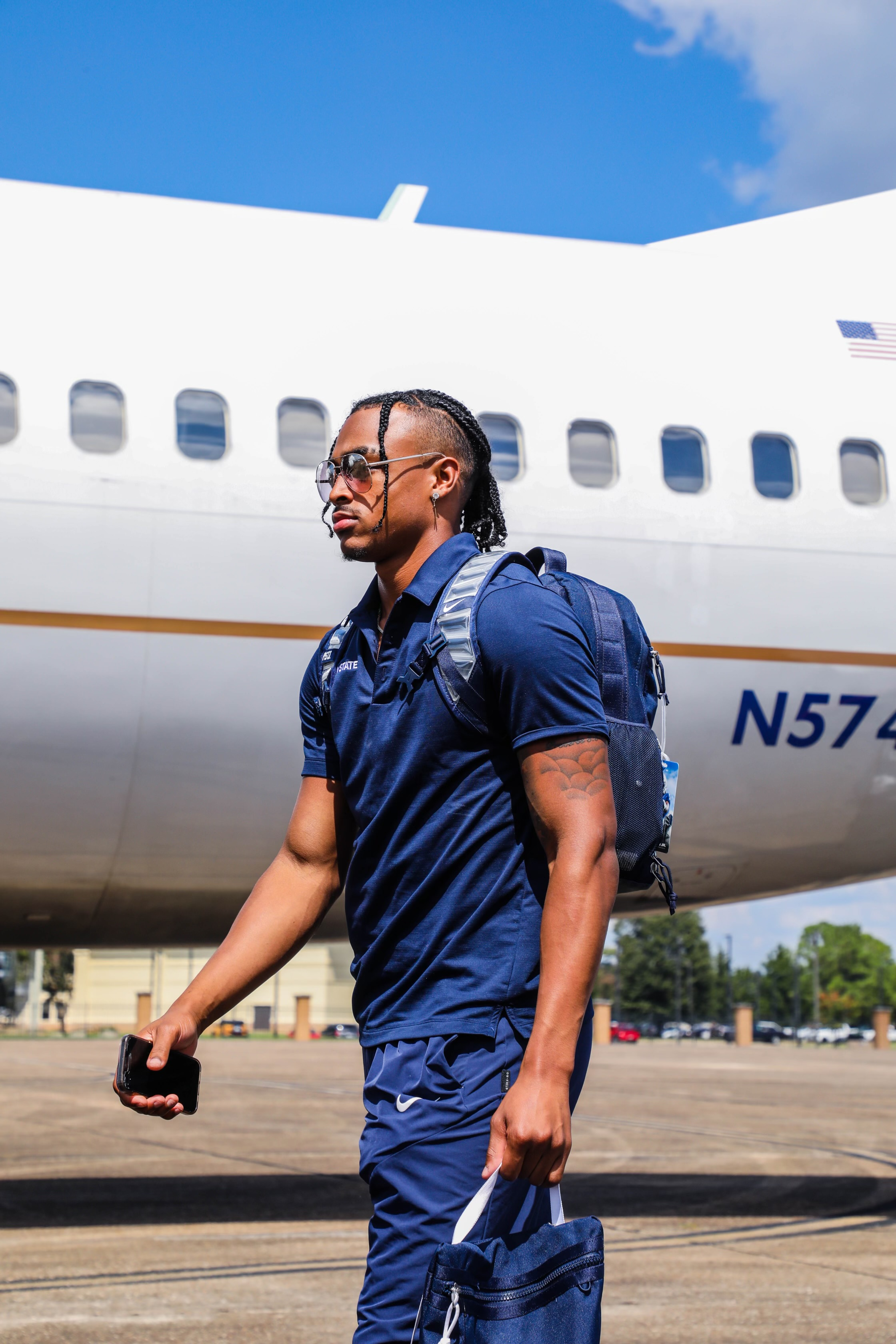
Winston in 2022

As a true freshman at Penn State in 2022, Winston Jr. played in 12 games and had 16 tackles. As a sophomore in 2023, he started 13 games and had 61 tackles and an interception. After the season, Winston was awarded All-Big Ten honorable mention laurels. He was named Big Ten Defensive Player of the Week for week one of the 2024 season following his performance against West Virginia. That same week, he was selected for the Chuck Bednarik Player of the Week Award. Winston Jr. was injured in his second game of the season against Bowling Green. Head coach James Franklin said he would be out for an extended period of time due to a long-term injury.

Winston Jr. plans on majoring in criminal justice at Penn State.

On December 12, 2024, Winston declared for the 2025 NFL draft.

== Professional career ==
Pre-draft measurables
Height	Weight	Arm length	Hand span	Wingspan	40-yard dash	10-yard split	20-yard split
6 ft 1 1/2 in (1.87 m)	215 lb (98 kg)	32 1/2 in (0.83 m)	9 1/2 in (0.24 m)	6 ft 8 7/8 in (2.05 m)	4.50 s	1.51 s	2.61 s
All values from NFL Combine/Pro Day

Winston was selected by the Tennessee Titans in the third round, 82nd overall, in the 2025 NFL draft. He made 10 appearances (six starts) for Tennessee during his rookie campaign, compiling two pass deflections, one sack, and 34 combined tackles. On December 16, 2025, Winston was placed on injured reserve due to a hamstring injury suffered in Week 15 against the San Francisco 49ers.
