= Nora School =

The Nora School
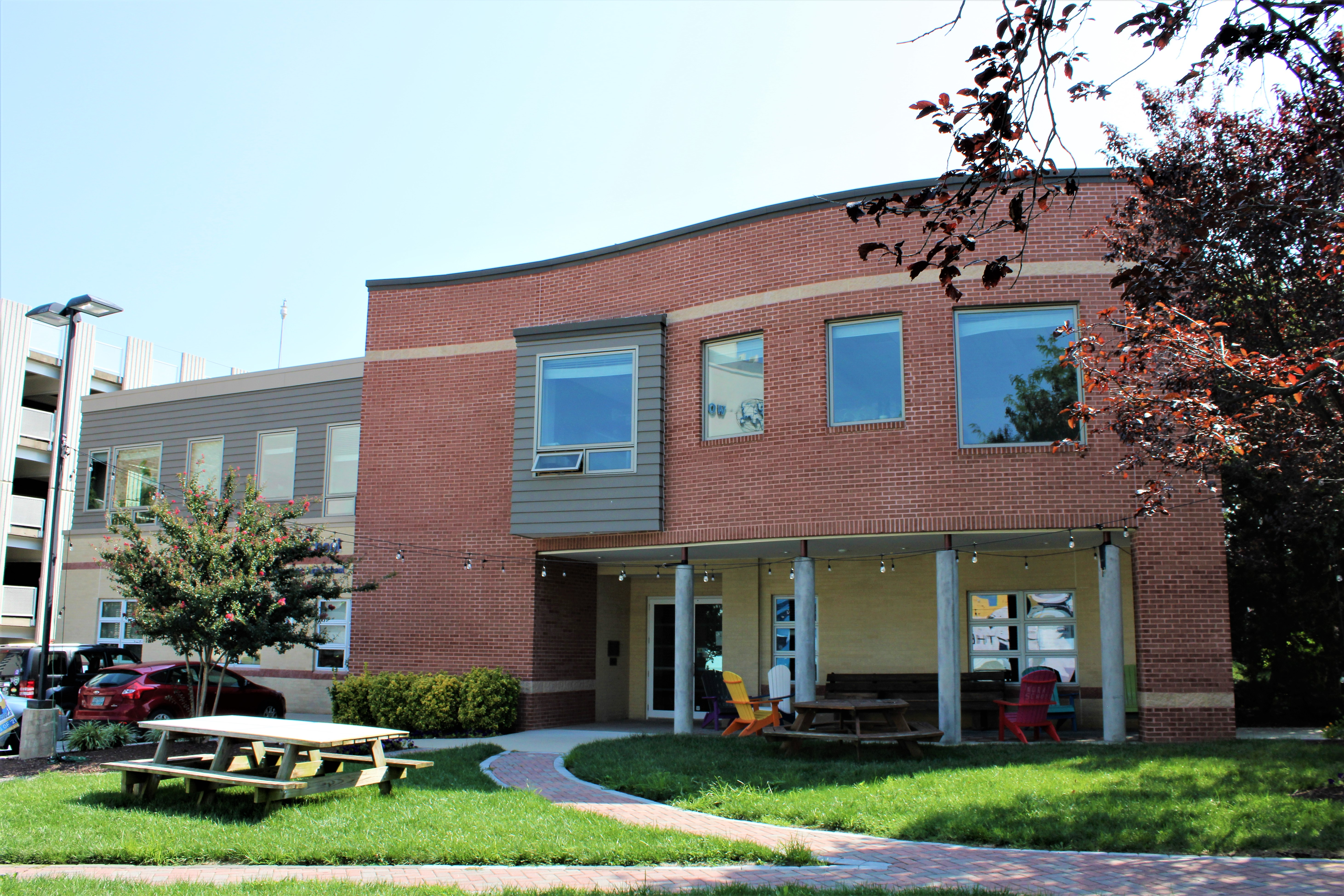

Location
- 955 Sligo Avenue; Silver Spring, Maryland 20910; United States; 38°59′25″N 77°1′31″W

Information
- School type: Private, Non-sectarian
- Founded: 1964
- Founder: Leon Eberhard
- Status: 501(c)(3) nonprofit school
- Chair: Judith Gelman
- Head of school: Mara Y. Nicastro
- Teaching staff: 11 FTE
- Employees: 16
- Grades: 9th grade to 12th grade
- Enrollment: 70
- Student to teacher ratio: 5.3
- Hours in school day: 6
- Endowment: $251,778
- Revenue: $1,731,589
- Website: www.norapride.org

The Nora School is a private progressive college-preparatory high school in Silver Spring, Maryland.

A nonprofit school with 501(c)(3) status, it was formerly known as The Eberhard School, Washington Ethical Society School, and Washington Ethical High School.

The school's mission is to guide students to identify their talents, understand where their challenges lie, and honor their unique identities. It works toward this goal through a diverse, active curriculum that uses teaching and operational strategies to promote social equity, justice, and environmental stewardship.

The school's social education program includes monthly community service projects; a student trip that follows the path of civil rights from Atlanta, Georgia, to Selma, Alabama; individual college counseling; and weekly advisory meetings. Students often attend leadership conferences in and out of the state. Classes include Future Issues, Global Communities, and Environmental Science.

== History ==
Founded in 1964 by Swiss educator Leon Eberhard as The Eberhard School, the school has changed names and locations several times. In 1968, Eberhard moved the school from Dupont Circle to the new Washington Ethical Society building at 16th Street and Kalmia Street NW, where it remained until 2000. Eberhard left the school in 1975 to found the Acton School in Northern Virginia. The school was adopted by the Ethical Society and renamed Washington Ethical Society School. Eberhard died in 1994.

The school fell on hard times financially, and had only 12 students when Sally Fisher from Sandy Spring Friends School was hired as Head of School in 1981. Fisher restored the school to academic and financial health over the next decade. In 1988, the school was renamed Washington Ethical High School, as it no longer had a formal affiliation with the Ethical Society. David Mullen was hired as Head of School in 1991. The school gained its first accreditation from the Middle States Association of Colleges and Schools in 1994.

Outgrowing the space and enrollment limitations of the Ethical Society building, the school began searching for property in the mid-1990s, culminating in the purchase of land in Silver Spring, Maryland. With a donation from former faculty member Beau Kaplan and his wife Linda, the school built a new building and grew enrollment by 50% in 2000. That same year the school was renamed The Nora School in honor of the Kaplans' late daughter. As of 2015, Beau Kaplan was Chair Emeritus.

The school expanded again in the fall of 2016, adding a second floor to its building on Sligo Avenue, doubling its size to about 11,000 square feet and adding a second science lab, a music room, student lounge and seminar room among other spaces.
