= The Gunston School =

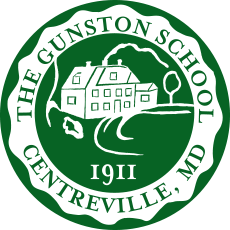
- Centreville, Maryland; 39.0417°N 76.0667°W

Information
- Former names: The Gunston Farm School, The Gunston School for Girls, Gunston Day School
- Type: Private school
- Motto: Multum in Parvo (much in little)
- Established: 1911
- Dean: Mark Wiening
- Headmaster: John Lewis
- Grades: 9-12
- Student to teacher ratio: 9:1
- Colors: Green and white
- Athletics: basketball, soccer, tennis, lacrosse, field hockey, sailing, crew, triathlon, cross country running, golf, volleyball
- Mascot: Heron
- Affiliation: NAIS, AIMS, Middle States, Maryland Green School
- Website: http://www.gunston.org/

The Gunston School is an independent, nonprofit, nonsectarian, coeducational, college preparatory high school located in Centreville, Maryland. Gunston draws students from seven Maryland counties: Queen Anne's, Kent, Talbot, Dorchester, Anne Arundel, Cecil, Caroline, and Delaware. There is also a small international student population that resides near the school with host families.

In the later 90s, the school experienced a decline in admissions, reportedly due to the decline in demand for gender-based boarding schools. Gunston administration then made the decision in 1995 to rebrand as a coeducational day school. The Gunston Day School was led by Jeffrey Wordworth in the early 2000s until his death in 2009. During his time as Headmaster Woodworth, he oversaw the addition of a crew team, the renovation of Middleton House, and the implementation of an international recruitment effort. His assistant headmaster, Christie Grabis, served as Interim Headmaster from 2009 to 2010.

== Academics ==
The Gunston School's 75-acre waterfront is used for athletics and the school's own environmental education. Gunston's class sizes range from 10 to 12 students on average with a 9:1 student-to-teacher ratio. There are 29 full and part-time faculty members in their college preparatory program that includes the humanities, science, math, the arts, and athletics. The school year is divided into two semesters with semester exams held in December and June. Gunston requires 24 credits for graduation.

== Athletics ==
The Gunston School hosts thirteen varsity team sports, five fitness programs, and two junior varsity sports teams. The school claims to have a wide range of athletic facilities: a six-court tennis facility, four full-size natural grass fields, a field house with a competition-sized basketball court, and the Corsica River with two docks for their sailing and rowing programs. As part of the school's holistic curriculum, all students must participate in a sport or fitness class for two of the three seasons each year.

Fall sports

- Boys Soccer
- Girls Soccer
- Girls Field hockey
- Girls Volleyball
- Co-Ed Sailing
- Co-Ed Crew
- Co-Ed Cross country
- Co-Ed Lifetime sports

Winter sports

- Girls Basketball
- Boys Basketball
- Girls Swimming
- Boys Swimming
- Indoor Crew

Spring sports

- Girls Lacrosse
- Boys Lacrosse
- Girls Tennis
- Boys Tennis
- Co-Ed Triathlon
- Co-Ed Pickleball
- Co-Ed Golf
- Co-Ed Crew
- Co-Ed Sailing
