= The Woods Academy =

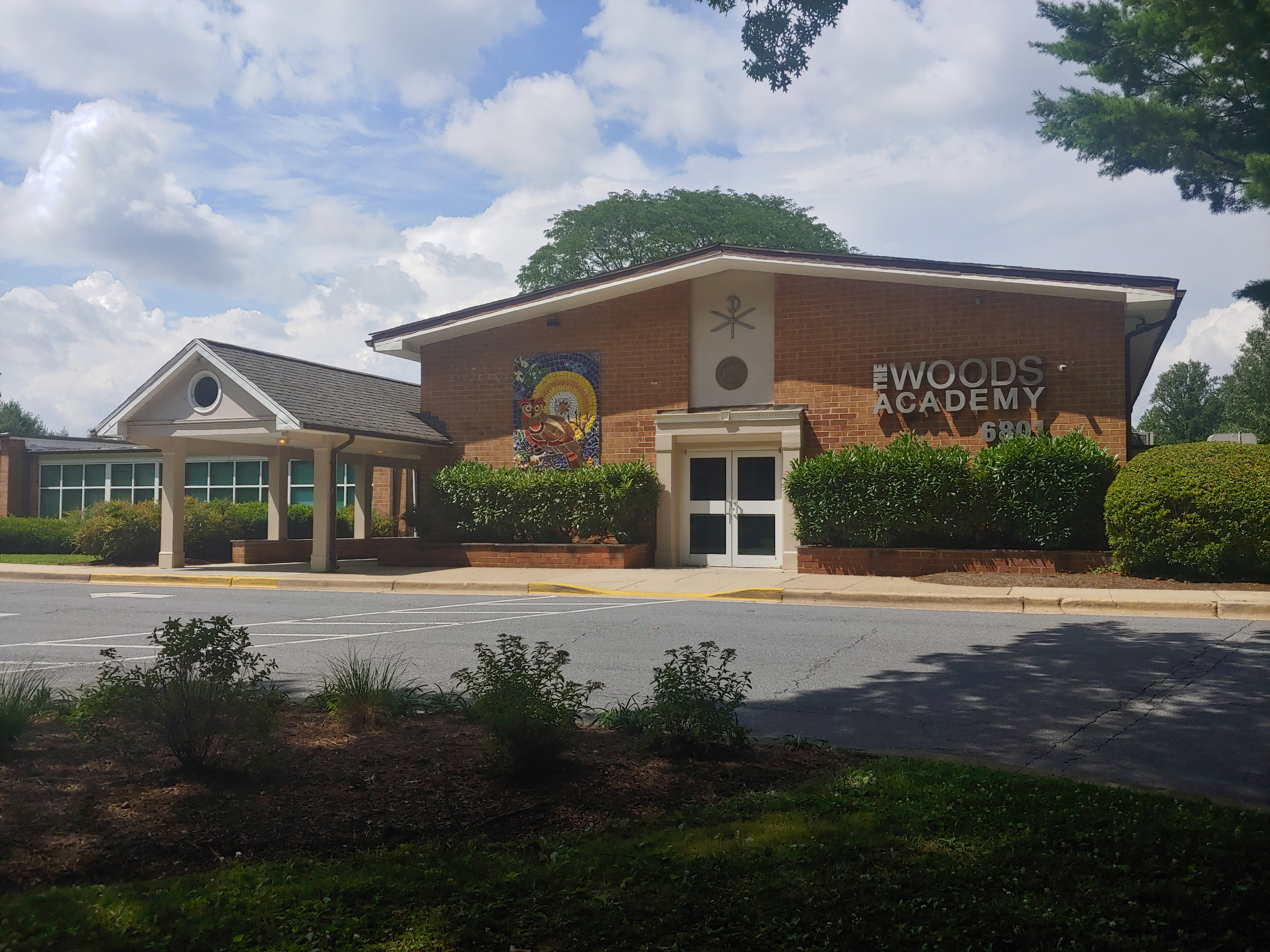

Location
- 6801 Greentree Road; Bethesda, Maryland 20817; United States; 39°00′31″N 77°08′18″W

Information
- Former names: Ursuline Academy; Our Lady of the Woods Academy
- Type: Private preschool, lower school, and middle school
- Religious affiliation: Catholic
- Established: 1975; 51 years ago
- Head of School: Dr. Jessica Palladino
- Teaching staff: 33.6 (FTE) (2019–20)
- Grades: PreK–Grade 8
- Enrollment: 261 (2019–20)
- Student to teacher ratio: 7.8 (2019–20)
- Colors: Green & White
- Team name: Mighty Owls
- Affiliations: National Catholic Educational Association (NCEA); American Montessori Society (AMS); National Association of Independent Schools (NAIS)
- Website: woodsacademy.org

The Woods Academy is an independent, Catholic, preschool, elementary school, and middle school for girls and boys ages three through fourteen, with an enrollment, as of the 2019–20 school year, of 261 students. The school is located on six acres in the Washington D.C. suburb of Bethesda, Maryland, U.S.

== History ==
The school originally opened over a half century ago as Ursuline Academy. In 1975, a group of dedicated parents re-established it as Our Lady of the Woods Academy and subsequently the Woods Academy. In 1977, the school moved to its current location at the intersection of Burdette and Greentree Road in Bethesda.

== School organization ==
- Montessori School Children ages 3 to 5 are welcome to participate in the Montessori Program at The Woods Academy. This program is accredited by the American Montessori Society.
- Lower School The Woods Academy Lower School includes grades 1 through 4. Students focus on literacy and math. They also have daily foreign language lessons and experiences in various forms of art.
- Middle School The Woods Academy Middle School includes grade 5 through 8. Students start to rotate to various classes and have content-specific teachers. The academics are rigorous and are designed to prepare students for high levels of success in elite high schools and colleges.

== Head of school ==
Dr. Jessica Pallandino is the head of school. She joined the school in the spring of 2023 and was previously the principal at the Rolling Terrace Elementary School in Takoma Park. She earned her PhD from the University of Maryland specializing in curriculum and instruction.

== Affiliations ==
The Woods Academy is affiliated with the following organizations:

- National Catholic Educational Association – Private, professional educational membership association
- American Montessori Society – American educational membership organization
- National Association of Independent Schools – Accreditation organization for independent schools
- Association of Independent Maryland & DC Schools – American nonprofit education organization
- Association of Independent Schools of Greater Washington – American nonprofit organizations

== Notable people ==
- M. Virginia Rosenbaum, county surveyor and newspaper editor; attended Ursuline Academy, a predecessor to the Woods Academy.
- Jerome Williams, former NBA player and current Woods Academy basketball coach.
