= Sheridan School =

Independent school in Washington, D.C.

Location
- 4400 36th Street, NW; Washington, DC 20008; 38°56′48″N 77°4′14″W

Information
- School type: Independent; Progressive
- Established: 1927
- Head of School: Courtney Martin
- Grades: K-8
- Enrollment: 225
- Student to teacher ratio: 6:1
- Campuses: Washington, DC; Luray, VA
- Accreditation: AIMS, MSA
- Website: www.sheridanschool.org

Sheridan School is an independent, co-ed, progressive, K-8 school in Washington, D.C. The school enrolls no more than 230 students. The average tuition for the 2025-2026 school year is $46,195. The school awarded $1.6 million in financial aid in 2025-2026. Forty percent (40%) of Sheridan students identify as students of color. In 2025, Sheridan was named an AMLE School of Distinction.

== History ==
Founded in 1927 as Mrs. Cook's School, Sheridan School was later renamed after its original location of Sheridan Circle on Embassy Row. Incorporated as a non-profit in 1961, it moved two years later to its current location on 36th Street, NW, in the North Cleveland Park neighborhood. In 1971, the school purchased a 130-acre Mountain Campus in Luray, Virginia.

== Mountain campus ==
Sheridan's Mountain Campus

The school also has a 130-acre Mountain Campus in Luray, Virginia, in the foothills of the Blue Ridge Mountains. This facility includes: platform tents, a dining hall, and a nature center. Activities include a zip line, a giant swing, a climbing wall and a high- and low-ropes courses. Each grade engages in the outdoor education program twice each school year.

== Notable alumni ==
- Al Gore, former Vice President of the United States, attended Sheridan from kindergarten to third grade.
- Eva Jinek, Dutch American journalist and television presenter
- Oliver Platt, Actor
