= Loudoun Country Day School =

Coordinates: 39.0481°N 77.5755°W

Location
- 20600 Red Cedar Drive; Leesburg, Virginia 20175; United States

Information
- School type: accredited, independent, coeducational
- Established: 1953
- Grades: Pre-school through 8th
- Campus size: 69 acres
- Accreditation: VAIS
- Website: Loudoun Country Day School

Loudoun Country Day School (LCDS) is an accredited, independent, coeducational pre-school through eighth-grade school located in Leesburg, Virginia.

== History ==
The school was founded in 1953 by Mrs. William J. McDonald and Mrs. J. Churchill Newcomb and after a few years found a home at 237 Fairview Street, NW. As of July, 2009, the school relocated to a new campus at 20600 Red Cedar Drive.

The school is accredited by the Association of Independent Schools and is a member of the National Association of Independent Schools (NAIS) and the Association of Independent Schools of Greater Washington (AISGW).

== Campus ==
In July, 2009, LCDS relocated to a newly constructed 69-acre (280,000 m^{2}) campus also located in Leesburg.

== Curriculum ==
LCDS offers a core curriculum and extensive programs in foreign languages, arts, music (including a string orchestra starting in fourth grade), STEM Lab, library, and athletics.

== Extracurricular activities ==
LCDS's after school activities include a variety of academic, arts and sports-related classes. LCDS conducts a variety of summer enrichment camps and partners with third-party vendors to offer additional camp opportunities on school's campus.
