= Parkmont School =

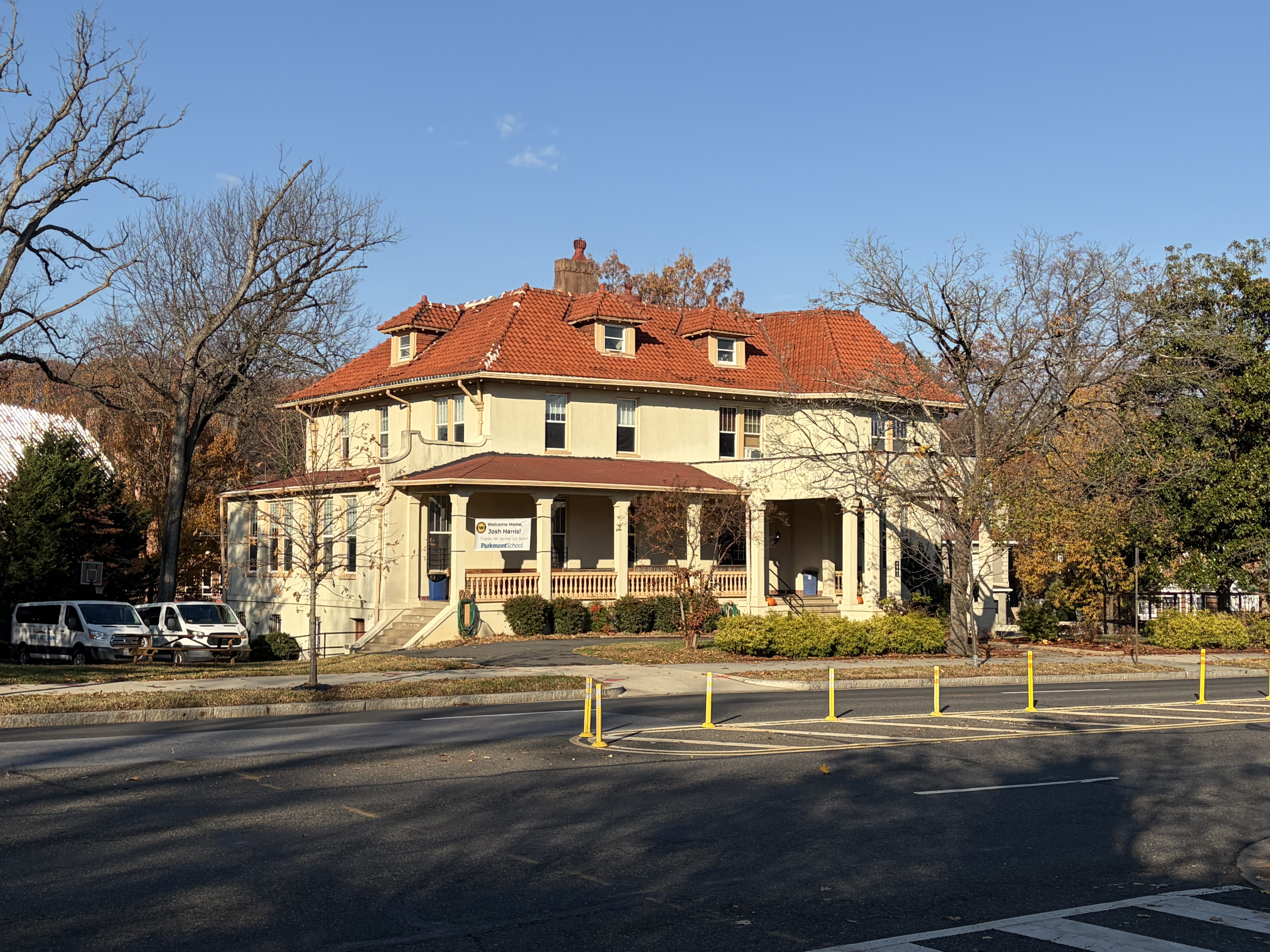
- Parkmont School in 2025.

Location
- 4842 NW 16th Street; Washington, D.C. 20011; United States; 38°57′00″N 77°02′12″W

Information
- School type: Private
- Established: 1972 (54 years ago)
- Head of school: Ron McClain (since 1981)
- Employees: 18 (2024-25)
- Grades: 6–12
- Enrollment: 55-65
- Average class size: Multi-grade 6-10
- Student to teacher ratio: 6:1
- Annual tuition: $52,800 (2024-2025)
- Website: parkmont.org

Parkmont School is a private school in Washington D.C. that serves 65 students in grades 6–12. The school is located at 4842 16th St NW, a few blocks from Rock Creek Park. Combining elements of both the Montessori and Parkway (School Without Walls) models, Parkmont's approach is highly individualized and experiential. Parkmont is non-sectarian and an Association of Independent Maryland and DC Schools accredited school.

== History ==
Parkmont was founded in 1972, as a cooperative parent-run middle school and became a board-operated 501(c)(3) in 1995. The school derived its name from the Parkway Program (Park) and the philosophy of Montessori education (mont).

Until 1977, Parkmont School was located at 16670 Chain Bridge Road in McLean, Virginia. With the help of a $100,000 grant, the school was able to relocate to Washington, D.C., to take better advantage of the educational opportunities available in the city.

In the spring of 1991, Parkmont School merged with Somerset School and moved to its current home.

== Parkmont teaching method ==
Parkmont School's approach of education uses Montessori Philosophy, founded by the progressive educator, Maria Montessori (1870-1952). The Montessori philosophy is based on "supporting the complete development of the child as they progress from birth to adulthood. It takes the broad vision of education as an aid for life."

One of Montessori's many accomplishments was the Montessori method. This is a method of education for young children that stresses the development of a child's initiative and natural abilities, especially through practical play. This method allowed children to develop at their own pace.

== Administration ==
As of 2025, the head of school is Ron McClain since 1982.
