= Washington Waldorf School =

Coordinates: 38°57′9″N 77°7′17.5″W

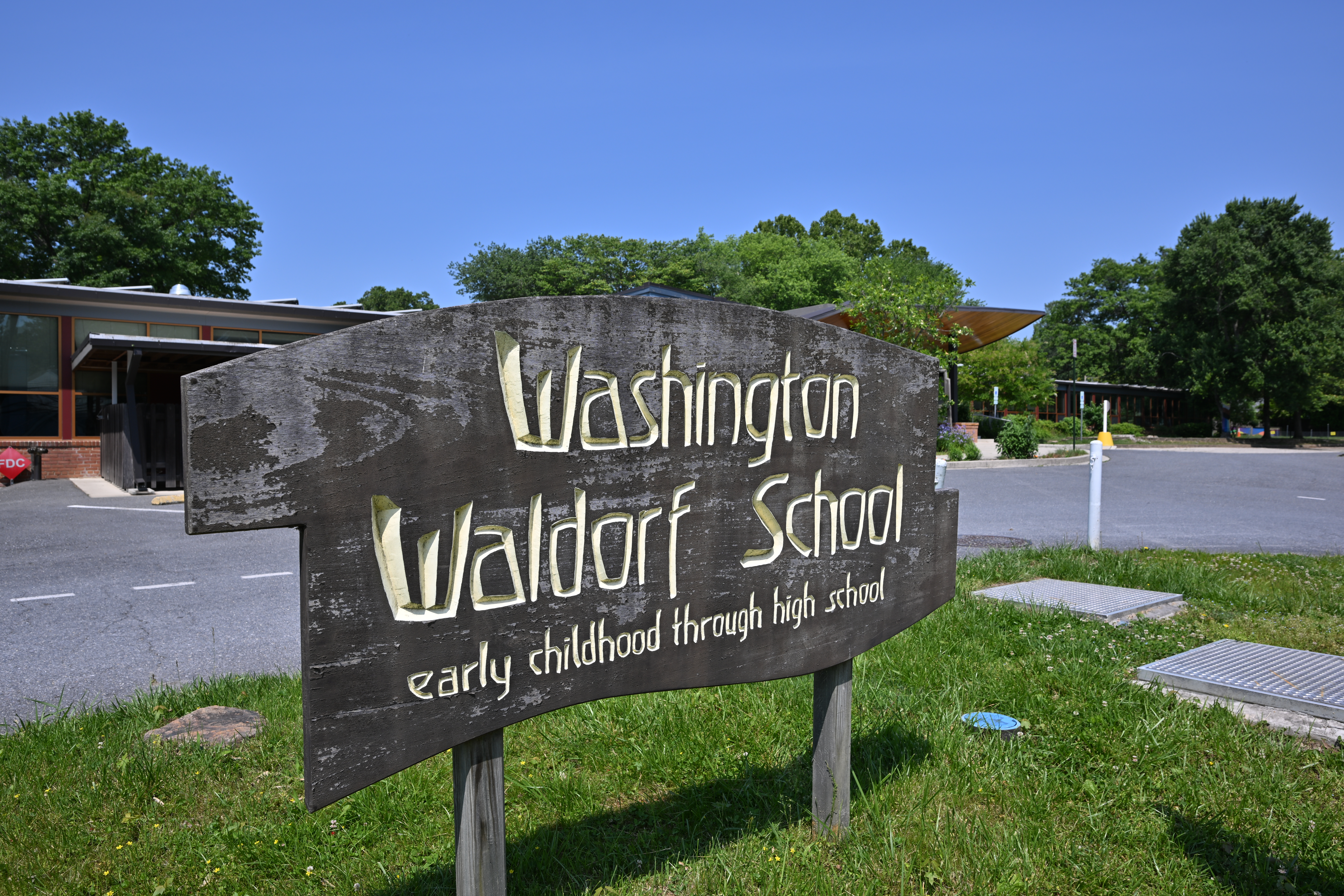

Location
- 4800 Sangamore Road; Bethesda, Maryland 20816; United States

Information
- Type: Waldorf school
- Faculty: 84
- Grades: Pre-K to 12
- Gender: Coeducational
- Enrollment: 280
- Average class size: 22 (Lower), 17 (High)
- Student to teacher ratio: 7:1
- Campus size: Six acres
- Campus type: Suburban
- Mascot: Red-Tailed Hawks
- Tuition: $20,200 - $40,800 (Varies)
- Website: Washington Waldorf School

The Washington Waldorf School is a private K-12 school in Bethesda, Maryland, just north of Washington, D.C., on a 6-acre campus the school rents from Montgomery County. The school also has exclusive use of another 6 acres of adjoining parkland during the school day.

As a Waldorf school, the curriculum is based on the educational philosophy of Rudolf Steiner. Washington Waldorf School is one of over 1000 Waldorf schools worldwide and 150 Waldorf schools in North America.

The school has one of the few outdoor kindergarten programs in the Washington, D.C., area.

== History ==
The Washington Waldorf School was founded initially as a grade school in 1969 in Washington, D.C., and in 1982 moved to its current campus in Bethesda, Maryland. The high school was added in 1984 and graduated its first 12th grade in 1988.

The school is accredited by Association of Independent Maryland and DC Schools and the Association of Waldorf Schools of North America.

== Academics ==
Washington Waldorf School is a college preparatory school whose curriculum follows a block rotation schedule, in which a single subject is studied intensively for around four weeks. Lessons are interdisciplinary, drawing connections across subjects to deepen student engagement with the material. High school instruction is conducted in a seminar format that emphasizes student participation and discussion.

In 2026 rankings from Niche, Washington Waldorf School was ranked the #2 Private K-12 School and the #5 Private High School in Montgomery County, MD and was ranked in the top 5% nation wide.

== Athletics ==
The school's sports teams (baseball, basketball, cross country, soccer, and track) compete in the Potomac Valley Athletic Conference. The school mascot is the Red-Tailed Hawks.

== Alums ==
Likolani Brown Arthurs, Former NYC Ballet Dancer now a surgical resident at NYU Langone Health

Laila Bunker, Director of Nursing Washington County, MD Health Department

Anabella Aspiras, Former Assistant Director, Cancer Moonshot Engagement at The White House

Josie Bicknell, National Science Foundation graduate Research Fellow, Dichtel Group Northwestern University Department of Chemistry

Mikaela Bufano, Producer at CBS Sunday Morning

Celia Braun, Professional soccer player, FC Basel Frauen

Rachel Chamberlin, PhD Senior Anthropologist, The Henry M. Jackson Foundation for the Advancement of Military Medicine

Megin Charner-Laird, Research Affiliate Harvard Graduate School of Education

Alexis Covey-Brandt, Senior Advisor to Governor Wes Moore

Elena Day, Former Cirque du Soleil performer, ProTrack Director and Head of Physical Theater at New England Center for Circus Arts

Daniel Foster, Principal Viola, National Symphony Orchestra

Sam Girdzis, PhD Researcher Institute for Defense Analyses

Caitlin Gorman, Manager Environmental Remediation, Pacific Gas and Electric Company

Jeff Johns, Media Producer, Author of Jet Lag Junkie: Unfiltered Tales of a Compulsive Wanderer

Nick Kendall, Grammy award winning violinist of the genre bending trio Time for Three

Zoe Kulik, National Science Foundation Postdoctoral Research Fellow; Vertebrate Paleontology

Alex Laing, Principal Clarinet, Phoenix Symphony

Nicholas LeBlanc, PhD Research Plant Pathologist, US Department of Agriculture (USDA) Agricultural Research Service (ARS)

Ayella Maile-Moskowitz, Postdoctoral Researcher, Southern Nevada Water Authority

Allie Miraglia, YouTube creator at Trent & Allie

Julia Roche, Legislative Affairs Director, Baltimore City Health Department

Max Silver, Supervising Producer, Netflix

Brian Spitulnik, 11 years as a Broadway dancer in Chicago, now a Psychotherapist

Brandon Tapia, 2023 Astronaut Scholar, pursuing PhD in Chemical Engineering at MIT

Noah Verleun, Co-Founder, Global Clean Energy Holdings

Guinevere Van Seenus, Top American model, photographer, and jewelry designer

== See also ==
- Curriculum of the Waldorf schools
