= German International School Washington D.C. =

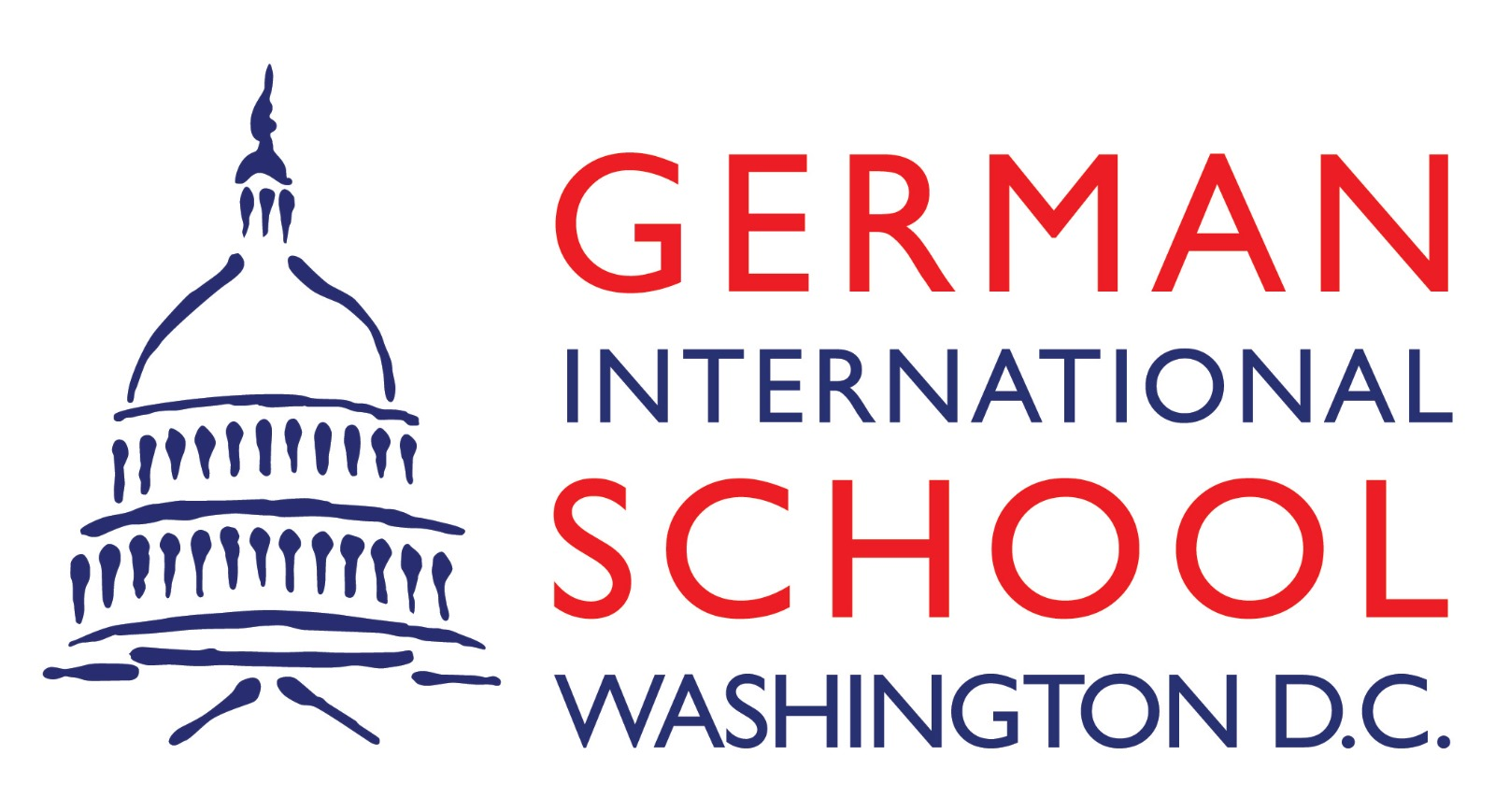
German International School Washington D.C.

Location
- Potomac, Maryland; United States; 39°0′39″N 77°10′36″W

Information
- Type: Private
- Established: 1961
- Head of school: Carsten Apsel
- Faculty: 80
- Grades: pre-K (age 2) to Grade 12
- Enrollment: 570
- Language: German; English
- Website: www.GISWashington.org

The German International School Washington D.C. (GISW), formerly Deutsche Schule Washington D.C. (DSW), is a private, co-educational school in Potomac, Maryland, covering levels preschool through 12th grade. As one of over 130 schools in the network of German Schools around the globe, the GISW has a strong focus on STEM subjects and world languages. The student body encompasses students age 2 in preschool through 12th grade. As of the school year 2022/23, knowledge of German is not required for admission to preschool through Grade 5. German language learning support is provided in the FastTrack program. The diplomas granted at the end of twelfth grade are the German International Abitur (DIA) and a US High School Diploma. These degrees provide students access to the best universities around the world. Information about the German International Abitur.

GISW is the first MINT-EC school in the United States of America.

On Saturdays, German Language Courses are offered for students age 3 through adults. In the Saturday program students can attain the Deutsche Sprachdiplom 1 and 2. (DSD1 and DSD2).

== History ==
The school was founded on September 11, 1961, with 33 students. Its original purpose was to deliver a German education to the children of diplomats in the Washington, D.C., area, though as it has grown over the years it has taken on a larger number of other students. The school is partially supported by the German government.

The school was previously in McLean, Virginia.

== See also ==
- German Americans
