= The Heights School (Maryland) =

- The Heights School Crest

Location
- 10400 Seven Locks Road; Potomac, Maryland 20854-4085; United States; 39°1′42″N 77°9′52″W

Information
- Type: Private, day
- Motto: "Crescite" (grow; increase, multiply (Genesis 1:28))
- Denomination: Roman Catholic
- Established: 1969
- School district: Independent
- Headmaster: Alvaro de Vicente
- Chaplain: Rev. Diego Daza; Rev. Rene Schatteman
- Faculty: 78
- Grades: 3–12
- Gender: Boys
- Student to teacher ratio: 6:1
- Colors: Red and white
- Slogan: "Men Fully Alive"
- Song: "To The Heights"
- Athletics conference: Washington Catholic Athletic Conference
- Mascot: Cavalier
- Team name: Cavaliers
- Accreditation: AdvancED
- Newspaper: The Heights Herald
- Affiliation: Opus Dei
- Website: www.heights.edu

The Heights School is a preparatory school for boys in grades 3–12 in Potomac, Maryland, United States. The Heights School offers a liberal arts curriculum in English, mathematics, classics, history, religion, science, Spanish, art, computers, and music.

As of 2025–2026, the school had a student body of 600 and 78 total faculty. The Upper School comprises almost half of the total enrollment, with 277 students across grades 9–12. Within the Upper School, the average class size is 17 and the student-to-faculty ratio is 7:1. Opus Dei, a personal prelature of the Catholic Church, supervises the school's religious orientation and spiritual formation. The local church authority, the Roman Catholic Archdiocese of Washington, however, does not include the Heights in their list of Catholic schools. Still, the faculty for the Catholic doctrine program as well as the curriculum are reviewed and approved by the Archdiocese of Washington.

== Athletics ==
The Heights School currently has 13 different sports teams: cross country, golf, soccer, basketball, squash, swimming, wrestling, baseball, lacrosse, tennis, track and field, rugby, and rock climbing.

The Heights School is known for fielding especially strong soccer teams. Products of The Heights program include former national team and professional player Freddy Adu. Players from The Heights are often recruited by top programs.

In the fall of 2018 – the first year of membership in the WCAC – The Heights varsity soccer team won the Washington Catholic Athletic Conference championship. The team was ranked #16 in the nation, and #2 in The Washington Post rankings. The Heights won the WCAC conference championship in 2023 ; the team ranked #1 in The Washington Post rankings.

The Heights also has a successful rock climbing team, which competes in the Washington Area Interscholastic Climbing League (WAICL). The league competes at indoor rock climbing gyms across the Washington DC metropolitan area, focusing on bouldering and top rope. Within the WAICL, the Heights fielded the top championship teams during the 2017/2018, 2023/2024, and 2024/2025 seasons. One notable climber, a member of the class of 2025, scaled a V11-grade bouldering climb.

Additionally, The Heights boasts a strong cross-country program, which regularly places in the top of the Washington Catholic Athletic Conference.

== History ==
A group of Catholic laymen, many belonging to the Prelature of Opus Dei ("Work of God"), founded the Heights as a middle school in Northwest Washington, D.C. in 1969. Among these was author and parenting expert James Stenson.

In 1978, The Heights purchased their campus in Potomac, Maryland and started the lower school. By 1983, construction of the main building allowed the entire school, grades three through twelve, to be united on the Potomac campus.

== Scholarships ==
The Peter Vincent Galahad Blatty scholarship is given once every four years to an outstanding student in honor of William P. G. Blatty, son of the author of The Exorcist and member of the Class of 2005, who died of a heart condition.

== Notable alumni ==
- Freddy Adu, professional soccer player; attended but eventually transferred
