= Browne Academy =

School

Coordinates: 38°47′20″N 77°5′2″W

- 5917 Telegraph Road; Alexandria, VA; United States

Information
- Type: Independent
- Established: 1941
- Founder: Marion Browne
- Head of school: Peggy Otey
- Faculty: 38
- Grades: PK3 through 8th
- Enrollment: 200
- Average class size: 12
- Student to teacher ratio: 6:1
- Mascot: Bruin
- Website: www.browneacademy.org

Browne Academy is an independent, coeducational day school in Alexandria, Virginia. It serves around 200 students age 3 through eighth grade on an 11-acre campus.

== History ==
Browne Academy was founded in 1941 as the first integrated school in Virginia. At the time, it was named the Brownie School, which continued to be the name of the preschool after the elementary school became Browne Academy in 1975. The Brownie School served preschool through third grade, and fourth and fifth grade were added in 1958. In 1986, a building was acquired to house the new middle school.

In 1998, the school built a new lower school in order to accommodate more students.

In 2007, Browne Academy students won a NASA contest to name the Harmony module carried by Space Shuttle Discovery.

In 2014, Browne Academy added a sustainable garden program with the goal of gardens for each class and a composting system.

== Demographics ==
The racial makeup of Browne Academy's K-8 student body during the 2017–2018 school year was 38.4% White, 32.1% African American, 22.1% multiracial, 3.7% Asian/Pacific Islander, 2.6% Hispanic, and 1% American Indian/Alaska Native. The students are mostly American citizens, but there is a small number of foreign students, such as Czechs and Italians.

== Academics ==
In addition to core subjects (Math, Science, History, and English), Browne Academy students study art, music, physical education, and Spanish. Browne Academy decided to end the French program in favor of a single Spanish class, because they felt that having both languages in the lower school would lead to an exposure program rather than one where students could become fluent in the language. Class size is limited to 15 students.

Browne Academy offers extracurricular activities, including junior choir, handbells, and taekwondo. Students may join soccer, basketball, cross-country, and ultimate Frisbee teams.

The school gives three character awards to students in each graduating class.

The school takes many field trips to locations relating to the curriculum. For example, the 6th grade takes a field trip to the Conowingo Dam as they do their unit on dams and water. The 8th grade compete in a yearly competition known as We The People, where they put their constitutional knowledge to the test.

Browne Academy created a robust learning program for the ongoing coronavirus pandemic.
