= Westminster School (Annandale, Virginia) =

- Annandale, VA; USA

Information
- Type: Private, Co-educational
- Motto: Presenting challenge. Building character. Instilling confidence.
- Established: 1962
- Headmaster: Nancy Schuler
- Faculty: 40
- Enrollment: 260
- Average class size: 15
- Student to teacher ratio: 11:1
- Colors: Purple Green & Gold
- Athletics: 5 Interscholastic Sports
- Athletics conference: Capital Athletic Conference
- Mascot: Griffin
- Website: www.westminsterschool.com

Westminster School is a coed Pre-K through eighth grade independent school located in a residential area of Annandale, Virginia. The Lower School encompasses grades Pre-K through 2, the Middle School is grades 3 through 5, and the Upper School is made up of grades 6, 7 and 8. Students are taught in a manner that balances STEM education with studies in the Classics. It is a part of the Virginia Association of Independent Schools.

== History ==
The school was established in 1962 by Jane Goll. Goll grew up wanting to be a teacher after being instructed in a traditional, classical education in New York City. Her own educational background was combined with her experiences traveling throughout Europe with her husband to form an idea of how she would want to teach students. After being dissatisfied with her work in both public and private schools in the United States she decided to found her own school.

In 1962, Goll opened a private Kindergarten class in St. Albans Episcopal Church in Annandale, Virginia. Throughout the early years, her school grew and soon she decided to give her school a new name. Her school kept expanding and a new building and wings were created between 1970 and 2003.

Goll died on September 5, 1992, and her position of Headmaster was passed on to Ellis Glover.

== Campus ==
Academic classrooms at Westminster School include technology such as smart boards, and are furnished with "executive style" or "tablet-arm" student desks. The 3rd, 4th and 5th grade academic classrooms are grouped together along a single corridor, and joins with a 6th, 7th and 8th grade corridors. These corridors along with the central hallway, which also houses 7th and 8th classrooms, form a central courtyard with a garden. This central courtyard was constructed in the style of a classical atrium.

The central hallway of the school building features "Shakespeare Windows", or mounted wooden cabinet windows that use the stained-glass overlay method. The creation of the windows was a joint effort between Tourne and Peter Shipman. For over five years, the graduating eighth grade class raised money in order to have a window created and donated to the school. The subject of the artwork was determined by the Shakespeare play that class performed in the seventh grade.

The newest section of the school includes the music studio, art studio, gymnasium and library. The gym allows for daily physical education classes. While most of the school is located on one floor, a wheelchair lift provides access to the gymnasium. The art studio is decorated with students' class art projects. The music studio also includes space for private lessons. The windows of the library overlook wooded view and provide natural sunlight. The library's collection includes more than 25,000 books and audio-visual materials. Inside the library is an additional resource center.

The school has a theater, playground, and recreational field. The theater is used for school productions that instruct students in presentation, technical aspects of the theater, and costume and set design. The playground includes climbing structures, social stations, slides, swings, and a junior-sized basketball court.

== Academics ==
Students are taught core subjects including language arts, mathematics, science and social studies. At different times throughout their time at Westminster, students also take courses on technology and geography. It is mandatory for students to participate in physical education, visual art, music and theater classes. Throughout all grades, pre-K through 8th, students learn the French language and in their last two years at Westminster they are enrolled in a Latin course.

The school also emphasizes personal presentation and etiquette.

== Extracurriculars ==
Westminster School maintains a theater program with all students at all grade levels performing in a play or musical each year. In 1981, students from the Middle School entered into a Folger Shakespeare Theater competition, affiliated with the Folger Shakespeare Library. This has led to an annual production of a Shakespeare play by the seventh grade class.

Students in the Middle and Upper Schools compete in athletic competitions with other independent schools in the Northern Virginia Region. Westminster is a part of the Capital Athletic Conference, with other institutions such as Congressional Schools of Virginia, Green Acres School, Immanuel Christian School, The Langley School, National Presbyterian School, Norwood School, St. Patrick's Episcopal School, and Woods Academy.

Students also participate in community service. They have formed a "Builder's Club" that has volunteered throughout the school's neighborhood, and at organizations such as The Center for Multicultural Human Services. Westminster's Builders Club is sponsored by the Kiwanis organization of Fairfax.

Additionally, the school sponsors a variety of clubs including Chess Club, French Club, Odyssey of the Mind, Mathcounts, and Science Olympiad.

== The Griffin Academy ==
Westminster School is affiliated with The Griffin Academy. This preschool is for three and four-year-olds and recently relocated from St. Alban's Church in Annandale, Virginia, to the main campus of Westminster School.
