= Norwood School (Montgomery County, Maryland) =

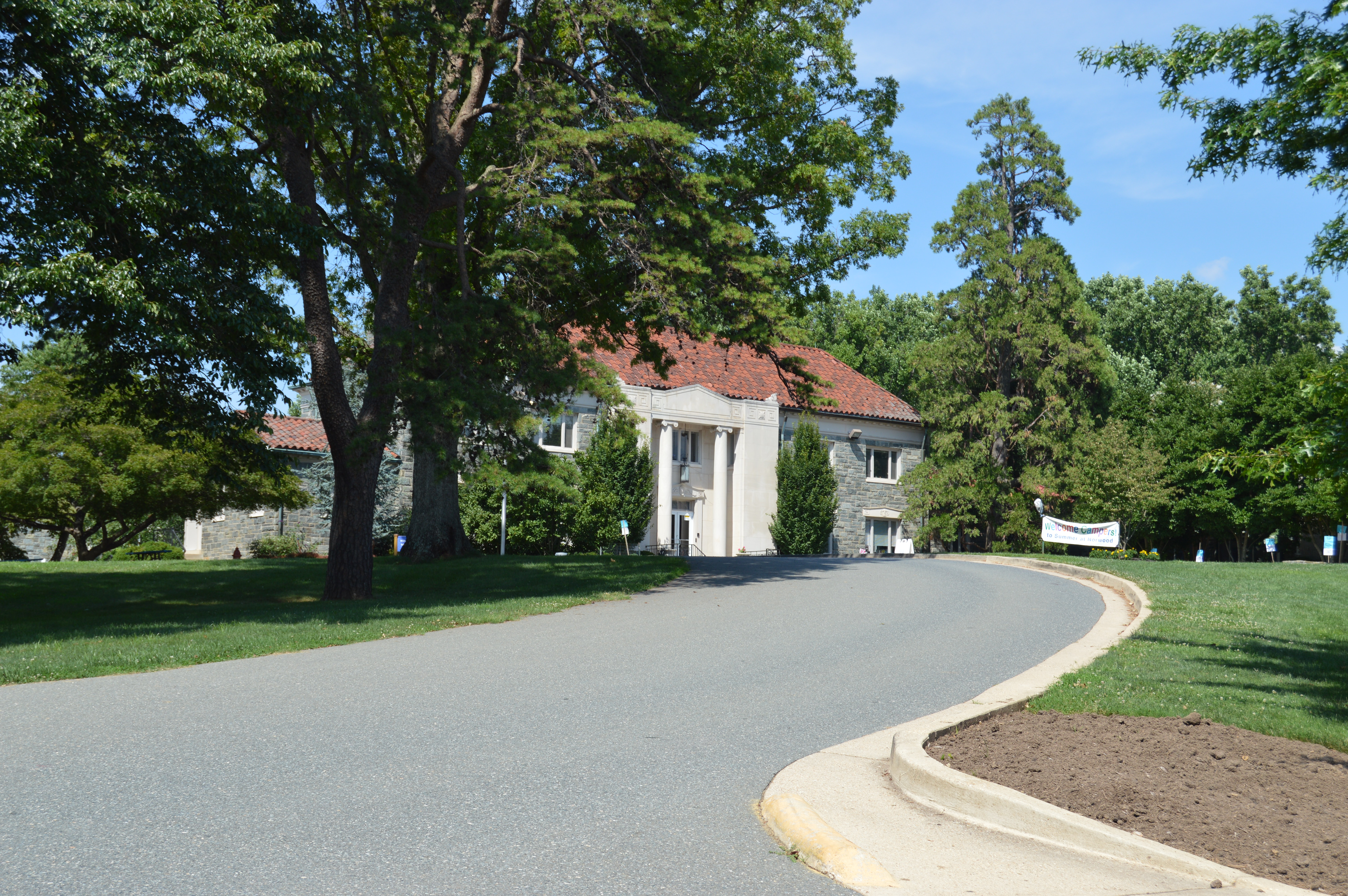
- Norwood School

Location
- 8821 River Road; Bethesda, Maryland 20817; United States; 39°0′5″N 77°10′39″W

Information
- Type: Independent
- Motto: How you lead your life matters.
- Religious affiliation: Nonsectarian
- Established: 1952
- Founder: Frances Marsh
- Head of school: Matthew A. Gould
- Faculty: 110
- Grades: PK-8
- Gender: Coeducational
- Enrollment: 450
- Student to teacher ratio: 6:1
- Campus: 40 acres (160,000 m^{2})
- Colors: Blue and white
- Mascot: Blue Hawk
- Accreditation: Association of Independent Maryland Schools (AIMS)
- Website: norwoodschool.org

Norwood School is an independent co-educational day school in unincorporated Montgomery County, Maryland for students in pre-kindergarten through eighth grade from 49 zip codes in Maryland, Virginia, and Washington, D.C. Norwood was founded in 1952. The school is located within the Potomac census-designated place, and it has a "Bethesda, Maryland" mailing address. The current head of school is Matthew A. Gould.

== Campus and facilities ==
Norwood's 40-acre campus is located in Bethesda, Maryland at the corner of River Road and Bradley Boulevard, less than a mile from the Capital Beltway. The property features two athletic fields for soccer and lacrosse, a baseball field, softball field, a smaller soccer field for the youngest students, outdoor education ropes course, archaeological dig site, and a learning garden and pond. Buildings include:

- Steuart Building – lower school classrooms, tutoring rooms, math and reading classrooms, Development Office, Communications Office, Admission Office, Lower School Office.
- Amanda Murray Arts Center – two lower school art studios, music room and performance stage, piano and violin practice rooms, and office of learning specialist.
- Ewing Building – Third and Fourth-grade classrooms, science labs, head of school's office.
- Marsh Building – lower school classrooms, math and reading classrooms, multi-purpose gymnasium, Health Office.
- Middle School Building – middle school classrooms, 10,000-volume Middle School Library, two art studios, band room, chorus room, world language classroom, Middle School Office, kitchen, cafeteria, network closet, multimedia center, two science labs.
- Rales Athletic Center – double gymnasium, multi-purpose athletic classroom, athletic offices, locker rooms.
- Marriott Early Childhood Building - Pre-kindergarten through second-grade classrooms, lower school library, math specialist classroom, reading specialist classroom

== History ==
Norwood was founded as an Episcopal parish day school. In early 1952, in response to requests from parishioners, the rector of St. John's Church, Norwood Parish, asked Frances Marsh, the director of the church's Sunday School, to start a parish primary school. The Vestry Resolution founding the parish school indicated that preference would be given to families from the Norwood Parish and then, as space was available, opportunity would be given to other church families in the community. That fall, the Norwood Parish School opened in the basement of St. John's Church with four teachers and 40 children in grades K-2. Third grade was added the following year. As a church school, it held religious services led by the rector and operated under St John's Vestry. The school prospered under Frances Marsh, though the small amount of space at St. John's limited both the possibilities for more school activities and the number of children who could attend. This led to the establishment of Norwood Inc., a non-profit corporation founded by Marsh and parents with the intention of finding a larger building.

Unhappy with this effort to relocate the school, the church vestry dismissed Frances Marsh as director of Norwood Parish School in March 1970. The families at the parish school helped Marsh establish the new Norwood School in temporary quarters for two years before its move to the current location on River Road in Bethesda in January 1972. Norwood has operated continuously since then as a non-profit, independent educational institution without religious affiliation.

Norwood moved to its current hilltop location in early January 1972. The Steuart Building, named in honor of Norwood grandparent Esther T. Steuart, first opened to students in January 1972. The following year, the board of trustees decided to expand the school through the sixth grade. A capital fund drive was launched for the purpose of erecting a new building to accommodate the school's upper three grades, a science laboratory, administrative offices, and a multi-purpose gymnasium. The fund drive was a success and the new building was finished in 1975. It was named after Frances Marsh.

In August 1995 the school acquired the adjacent 16.7-acre (68,000 m^{2}) estate which provided ample room for expansion. Subsequently, after two years of deliberation informed by Board committee work, faculty/staff planning, and parent meetings and surveys, the board of trustees made the decision in May 1996 to expand the school to include grades seven and eight. The first seventh grade class opened in September 1998, followed by the first eighth grade in September 1999. That same month, the school opened its new middle school and athletic buildings, which provided classroom space for fifth through eighth grades, a library, two science laboratories, choral and instrumental music rooms, two light-filled art rooms, lunch facilities, two basketball courts, a training room, locker rooms, and athletic offices.

Since its founding in 1952, Norwood has had five heads of school:

- Frances Brandis Marsh, 1952-1977
- Thomas C. Hudnut, 1977-1982
- Miriam Fulton Block, 1982-1983 (Interim Head)
- Richard T. Ewing Jr., 1983-2014
- Matthew A. Gould, Ph.D., 2014–Present
