= Connelly School of the Holy Child =

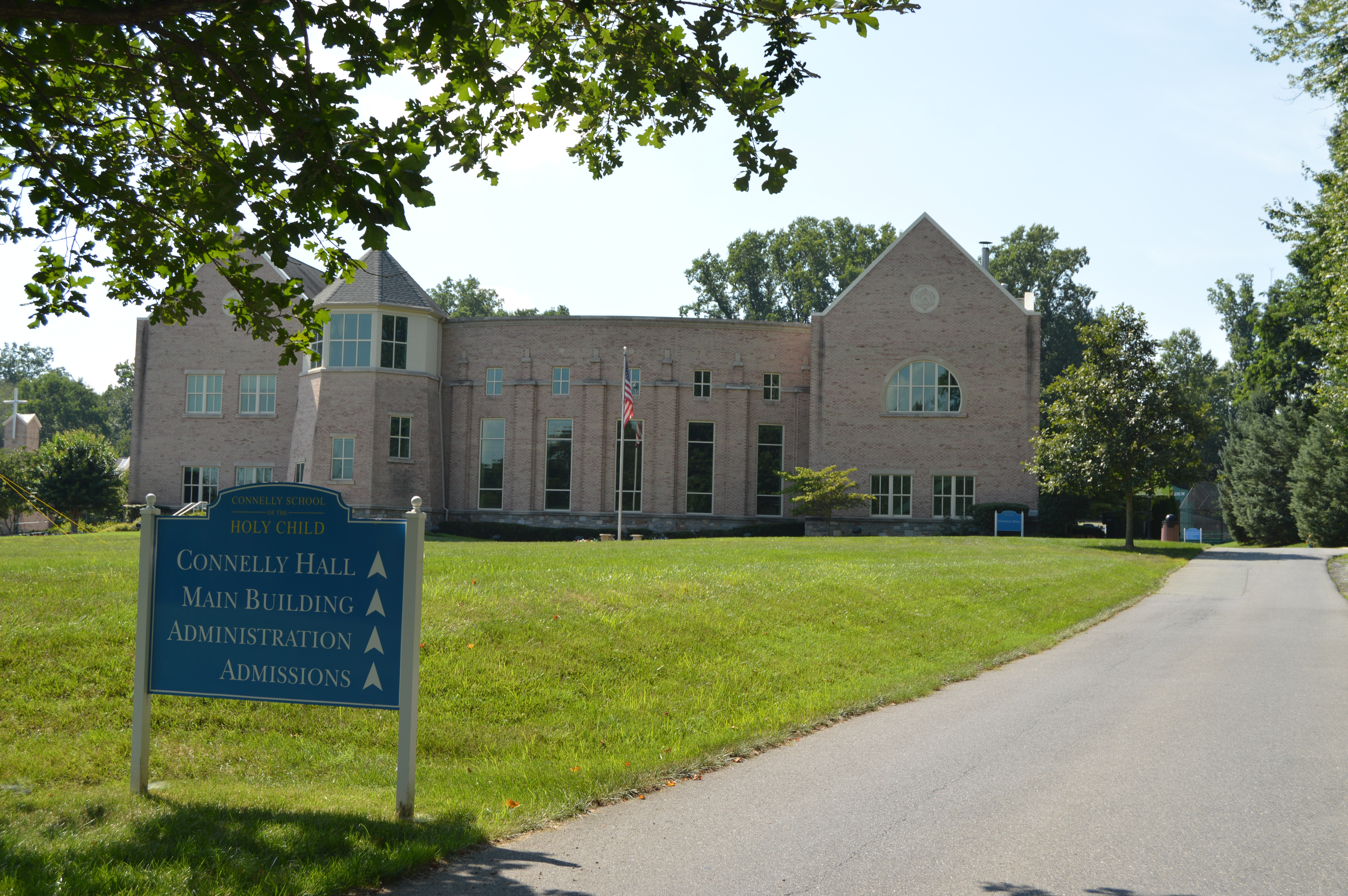
- Connelly School of the Holy Child

Location
- 9029 Bradley Boulevard; Potomac, Maryland 20854; United States; 39°0′0″N 77°11′14″W

Information
- Type: Private, All-Girls
- Motto: "Actions, not words"
- Religious affiliation: Roman Catholic
- Established: 1961
- School district: Archdiocese of Washington Catholic Schools
- Head of School: Julia Maurer
- Grades: 6–12
- Colors: Blue and gold
- Team name: Tigers
- Accreditation: Middle States Association of Colleges and Schools
- Newspaper: The Willow
- Admissions Director: Meghan Cross
- Athletic Director: Jamie Ready
- Website: https://www.holychild.org/

Connelly School of the Holy Child is a Catholic, independent, college-preparatory school for girls, grades 6-12 located in Potomac, Maryland. It is operated independently in the Archdiocese of Washington, and is a member of the Association of Independent Schools of Greater Washington and the Association of Independent Maryland Schools.

== History ==
Connelly School of the Holy Child, established by the Society of the Holy Child Jesus in Potomac in 1961, is a Catholic, independent, for girls, grades 6-12. The school is part of a network of Holy Child schools, with a curriculum based on the educational and moral teachings of Cornelia Connelly.

== Curriculum ==
Upper School graduation requirements include 4 English credits, 4 Religion credits, 4 Mathematics credits, 3 Science credits, 3 Social Studies credits, 3 Foreign Language credits, 2 Fine Arts credits, and 1.5 Physical Education credits. The school also offers AP courses.

== Athletics ==
Holy Child participates in the Independent School League. Seasonal sports offered at Holy Child include soccer, field hockey, volleyball, cross country, and tennis in the fall; swimming, basketball, and indoor lacrosse in winter; lacrosse, softball, track, golf, and tennis in spring; and equestrian and dance in all seasons.
