= McLean School of Maryland =

McLean School

Location
- 8224 Lochinver Lane; Potomac, Maryland 20854; United States
- Coordinates: 39°2′21″N 77°10′4″W

Information
- Type: Private Preparatory School
- Established: 1954
- Head of School: Barry Davis
- Campus: Suburban
- Colors: Blue; White
- Athletics conference: Potomac Valley Athletic Conference
- Mascot: Mustangs
- Website: www.mcleanschool.org

McLean School (formerly the McLean School of Maryland) is a K-12 co-educational, college preparatory school with two campuses in Potomac, Maryland. The school serves students, including those with dyslexia, anxiety, ADHD, and organizational challenges.

== History ==
Founded in 1954 by Lenore and Delbert Foster, McLean School is an independent, coeducational, college preparatory day school for bright students in kindergarten through grade 12. The school got its name after the McLean Gardens in Northwest Washington, D.C. as it was started on the ground floor of one of the original buildings. The school was forced to move to its current location when the demand for housing in the area grew.

== Athletics ==
McLean students participate in the following varsity sports: basketball, cross country, baseball, lacrosse, soccer, softball, track and field, volleyball, and wrestling.

Students compete in the Potomac Valley Athletic Conference.

In 2020, David Gregory, former moderator of Meet the Press, and his wife, Beth Wilkinson, founding partner of the law firm Wilkinson Stekloff, donated $1.5 million to establish the Athletics, Coaching, and Mentoring Program. This initiative delivers research-based practices, as well as educational strategies, to coaching.
