= St. Patrick's Episcopal Day School =

Coordinates: 38.9159°N 77.0912°W

Saint Patrick's Episcopal Day School
- Washington, D.C. USA

Information
- Type: Independent Elementary and Middle School
- Religious affiliation: Episcopal
- Established: 1956
- Head of School: Jalene Spain-Thomas
- Enrollment: 510
- Campus: Elementary and Middle School
- Colors: Green and White
- Athletics: Cross-country, Soccer, Basketball, Lacrosse, Track and Field
- Athletics conference: The Capital Athletic Conference (CAC)
- Mascot: The Wolfhound
- Website: www.stpatsdc.org

St. Patrick's Episcopal Day School is an independent nursery, elementary, and middle school in Washington, D.C. It is affiliated with St. Patrick's Episcopal Church.

== History ==
Founded in 1956 as a nursery school in a townhouse basement, the school has grown into a 500-plus student institution with separate elementary and middle school campuses in Washington D.C. Plans to construct a new high and middle school campus are underway.

=== School expansion ===
The school was founded by St. Patrick's Church as a parish nursery school in 1956.

In 1966, the school began adding grades 1 through 6.

In 1985 the church moved its chapel to the current site adjacent to the school.

The school began a seventh and eighth grade program in 2001. Originally small and meeting in a portion of another school's property, the St. Patrick's middle school has grown to near-capacity. It is now housed in a large renovated house on MacArthur Boulevard. The campus boasts a beautiful library, along with two separate humanities rooms for grade 7 and 8. At the same time, middle school students attend their math, science, and stem classes at the other campus.

In 2002, the school completed a major addition and renovation, which converted the outdoor "Play Court" into a three-story academic wing with six classrooms for grades 2 and 3 and a large library with floor-to-ceiling windows. The construction also involved the building of a new gym/stage across the street from the main building, the conversion of the old gym into an art studio, playroom, and conference room and the addition of a glassed-in foyer and reception area to the front of the school.

In 2004, The Friends of Saint Patrick's Episcopal Day School made the winning bid for the Casey Mansion property at 1801 Foxhall Road. This property had been offered to the District of Columbia as a possible site for a Mayor's Residence, but the District was unable to bring about the purchase.

=== Community relations ===
When the middle school campus was originally proposed, neighbors included then-ANC Chair Alma Gates, were concerned about the potential for disruption from a school housed in a house in a residential neighborhood. To accommodate the neighbors, several restrictions are in place: students are picked up and dropped off at the elementary campus.

When the plans for the high school campus began, the school started working with the campus neighbors much earlier. The result of this greater outreach was passing through the first steps of the Zoning process with no neighborhood opposition.

== Refereed papers by faculty ==
- Early Childhood Research and Practice, an online education journal The Construction Project, Berry and Allen.
