= Mater Dei School (Bethesda, Maryland) =

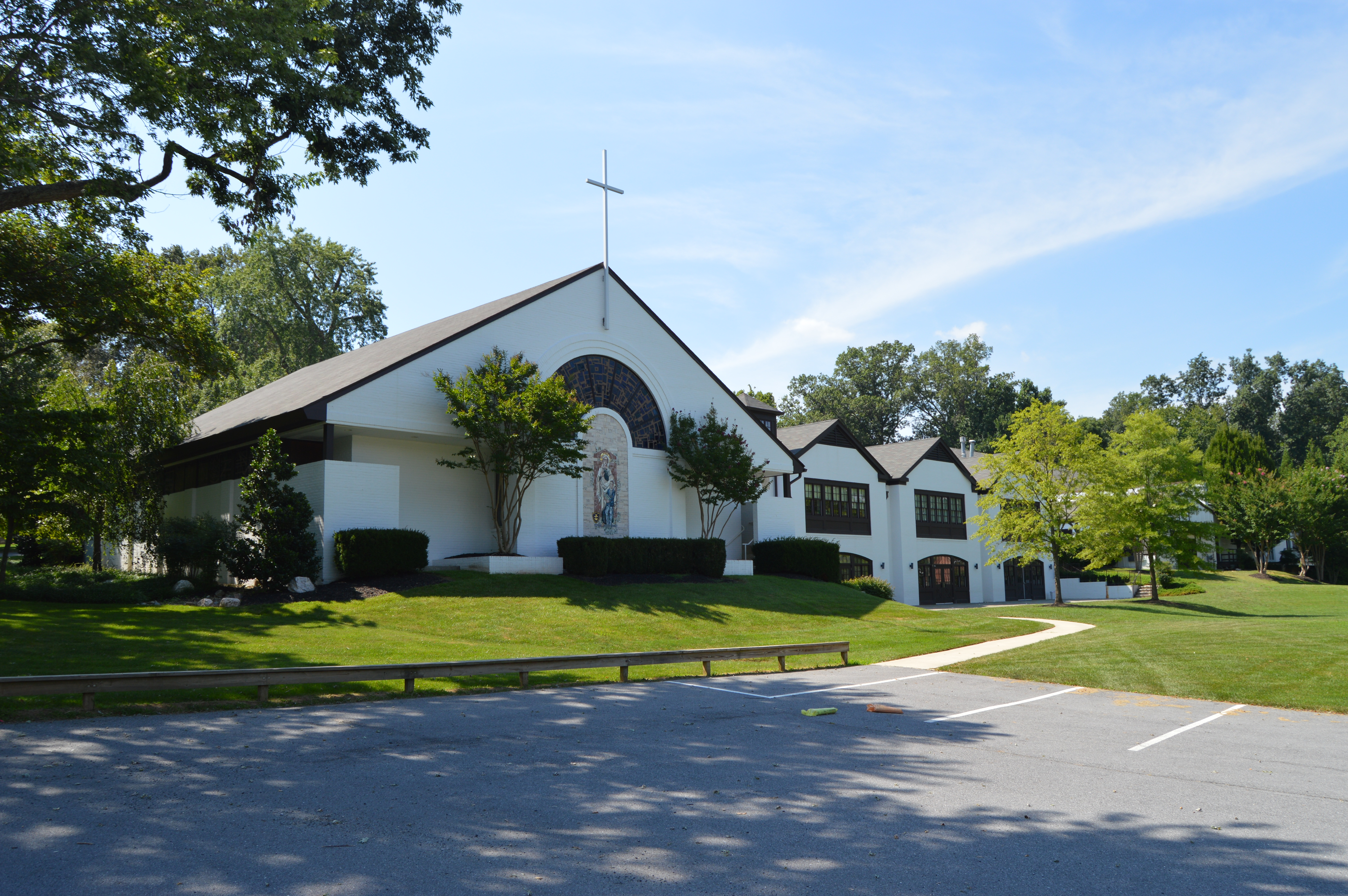
- The Mater Dei School

Location
- 9600 Seven Locks Road; Bethesda, Maryland 20817; United States; 39°0′51″N 77°9′42″W

Information
- Type: Independent school
- Motto: Work hard, play hard, pray hard and be a good guy.
- Religious affiliation: Roman Catholic
- Established: 1960
- Founder: Robert W. Barros
- Headmaster: William G. McMurtrie
- Grades: 1-8
- Gender: Boys
- Enrollment: 228
- Student to teacher ratio: 12:1
- Colors: Blue and White
- Nickname: Griffins
- Tuition: Tuition for the 2024-2025 academic year is $23,275
- Website: www.materdeischool.net

Mater Dei is an elementary school for boys grades 1 through 8, conducted by Catholic laymen, in Bethesda, Maryland.

== History ==
Mater Dei was founded in 1960. Founder Robert W. Barros III, who was headmaster until 1985, modelled the school after Saint David's School, an all-boys Catholic school in New York City. It opened with 55 students at a campus on Churchill Road in Silver Spring, Maryland, but moved to its present location in 1964, having expanded to 172 students.

Controversy over allowing women on the school's board of trustees ended with an election in which five men and three women ran for five spots. Once elected, Edward Bennett Williams stepped down in order to give his spot to a woman by default. His son, Edward "Ned" Williams, later became Mater Dei's headmaster.

== Demographics ==
During the 2018–19 school year, Mater Dei's 230 students were 91% white, 6% black, 2% Asian, 2% Hispanic, and 1% multiracial. 88% were Catholic.

== Notable alumni ==
- Mark Shriver, '78, politician who served in the Maryland House of Delegates and member of the Kennedy family.
- Brett Kavanaugh, '79, United States Supreme Court Justice.
- Christopher Jarzynski, physicist who created the Jarzynski equality.
- C. J. Kemp, '95, former professional lacrosse player.
- Marcus Mason, '99, former NFL player.
- George Huguely, '02, murderer.
- Markel Starks, '06, professional basketball player.
- Nate Britt, '09, professional basketball player.
- Kris Jenkins, '09, professional basketball player known for hitting a buzzer-beating shot to win the 2016 NCAA men's basketball championship for Villanova.
- Scotty Washington, '11, NFL player.
- Anthony Cowan, '14, basketball player.
- Hunter Dickinson, '16, basketball player.
- Tommy Morrison, '19, golfer.
- Blake Harper, '20, basketball player.
