= Eddie Doherty =

American journalist and book author

- Born: Edward Joseph Doherty; October 30, 1890; Chicago, Illinois, U.S.
- Died: May 4, 1975 (aged 84); Combermere, Ontario, Canada
- Occupations: Reporter; author
- Spouse: Catherine Doherty
- Children: 2

Edward Doherty (October 30, 1890 – May 4, 1975) was an American newspaper reporter, author and Oscar-nominated screenwriter. Twice-widowed, he married once more to Catherine de Hueck Doherty, founder of the Madonna House Apostolate, and later was ordained a priest in the Melkite Greek Catholic Church.

== Life and career ==
The eldest of ten children, Eddie Doherty was born in Chicago in 1890 to police Lieutenant Edward Doherty and Ellen (Rodgers) Doherty. At the age of 13 he went to try his vocation with a Servite monastery in Wisconsin, but left the seminary two years later. Returning to Chicago, he went to work at the City Press.

Starting as a newspaper copy boy, Doherty worked at various other Chicago newspapers, including the Examiner, the Record-Herald, the Tribune, the Herald, and the American. It was at the American that he began writing columns. He married his childhood sweetheart, Marie Ryan, on December 15, 1914. His wife died in the 1918 flu epidemic, leaving him with a baby son. Doherty left the Church in his sorrow. The following summer he married his second wife, a journalist named Mildred Frisbee.

Back at the Tribune, he helped establish the Joseph Medill School of Journalism. After a short time at a newspaper in Tampico, Mexico, Doherty, his wife and two children moved to California where he started working for the Chicago Tribune's Hollywood bureau. He covered such sensational scandals as the Wallace Reid case and the Fatty Arbuckle trial. He also covered Prohibition, gangland killings, Daddy Browning and Peaches, and the Lindbergh flight to Paris.

Wary of desk jobs, he once said: “Never be a rewrite man, because it's a killing job. Never be a press agent. There's nothing on earth lower than a press agent — unless maybe it's a copyreader.” To illustrate the point to his son, he recalled what had happened to him when he covered the Pancho Villa insurrection in Mexico for the Chicago Tribune: “I sent back a singing line about a forgotten, flea-bitten little Mexican town, and I described it this way: ‘Half a dozen ‘dobe huts and half a hundred hounds.’ And what do you suppose the copyreader changed it to? ‘Six adobe houses and 50 dogs!’”

After three years in Hollywood, Eddie moved his family to New York, where he went to work for Liberty magazine. Over the years, he would write over a thousand articles for Liberty, which was edited by Fulton Oursler.

Tragedy struck again in 1939 when Mildred, while out for a walk, was killed in a freak accident. This time, Eddie found peace for his grieving by returning to the Church. He also wrote his autobiographical Gall and Honey.

He eventually discovered Friendship House in Harlem and its Russian foundress, Baroness Catherine de Hueck, who was caring for the poor and devoting her life to interracial justice.

“Friendship House worked for and with the [African-American people]. It dispensed charity of all kinds, without asking questions, without hesitation. It fought for interracial justice. It fostered study clubs, credit unions, co-operative associations, and other advanced ideas of self-help for the [African-American] poor. And it disseminated Catholicity in a thousand ways. I became enamored with the place, with the young people who worked under the direction of the Baroness, and with their mode of life. And, eventually, of course, I fell in love with the foundress.”

Eddie and Catherine were married in 1943 by Bishop Bernard Sheil of Chicago, after Eddie promised that Catherine's apostolate would always come first in their lives.

In 1944, Doherty's screenplay for the World War II film The Sullivans was nominated for an Academy Award for Best Original Story. The movie tells the story of the five Sullivan brothers from Waterloo, Iowa, who were killed in action when the USS Juneau was torpedoed and sunk by the Japanese at the Naval Battle of Guadalcanal.

Eddie and Catherine's marriage was not well received by the staff at Friendship House and, combined with other problems, led to Catherine's resignation as Director General. In 1947, the couple withdrew to Combermere, Ontario, Canada, intending to simply live out their retirement. Instead, a new apostolate called Madonna House came into being and continues today.

On August 15, 1969, at the age of 78, Doherty, in whose heart had always been the desire to become a priest, was ordained in Nazareth by Archbishop Joseph Raya in the Melkite rite of the Greek Catholic Church, which permits married priests. He continued to live and work at Madonna House, writing books, celebrating the liturgy, and serving as a father figure to the young community.

Doherty died on May 4, 1975. A cross on his grave says, “All my words for the Word.”

== See also ==
- Restoration (newspaper)
- Eastern Catholic Churches
