= Francis Martin (biblical scholar) =

American Catholic priest and biblical scholar

The Reverend Francis Martin
- Church: Catholic Church
- Archdiocese: Washington, D.C.

Orders
- Ordination: 1956

Personal details
- Born: October 20, 1930 New York City, U.S.
- Died: August 11, 2017 (aged 86)
- Buried: Germantown, Maryland

Academic background
- Education: College of the Holy Cross (BA); Pontifical Biblical Institute (STL); Pontifical University of Saint Thomas Aquinas (SSD)
- Thesis: Encounter Story: A Characteristic Gospel Narrative Form (1978)
- Doctoral advisor: Donatien Mollat, Marie-Émile Boismard, Francis McCool

Academic work
- Discipline: Theology
- Institutions: Dominican House of Studies; John Paul II Institute; Catholic University of America; Franciscan University of Steubenville; Sacred Heart Major Seminary
- Influenced: Mary Healy

Francis Martin (October 20, 1930 – August 11, 2017) was an American Catholic priest of the Archdiocese of Washington, and a professor of Sacred Scripture. His teaching appointments included the Dominican House of Studies, the John Paul II Institute, the Catholic University of America, and Sacred Heart Major Seminary. Martin was an advisor to Cardinal Leo Joseph Suenens during the Second Vatican Council.

== Biography ==
Martin was from the Bronx, New York City, and attended the College of the Holy Cross in Worcester, Massachusetts. He entered St. Joseph's Abbey in Spencer, Massachusetts, where he was ordained in 1956 to the Trappist Order. As a Cistercian, he earned an STL from the Pontifical University of Saint Thomas Aquinas in 1959 and his Doctorate in Sacred Scripture (SSD) from the Pontifical Biblical Institute in 1978. The advisors for his SSD thesis, entitled "Encounter Story: A Characteristic Gospel Narrative Form", were Donatien Mollat, S.J., Marie-Émile Boismard, O.P., and Francis McCool, S.J. Martin's approach to biblical literary criticism was especially influenced by Luis Alonso Schökel.

During the Second Vatican Council, Martin was an advisor to Leo Joseph Suenens, the Archbishop of Mechelen–Brussels. Martin encountered the Catholic charismatic renewal through the Madonna House Apostolate in Combermere, Ontario, and he became a leader of the movement. He joined the Mother of God Community in Gaithersburg, Maryland, in 1978 and became the community's chaplain in 1997, the same year he was incardinated into the Archdiocese of Washington.

During the course of his career, Martin taught at the Dominican House of Studies, the John Paul II Institute, the Gregorian University, the École Biblique, the Catholic University of America, and Sacred Heart Major Seminary, and the Franciscan University of Steubenville. He published over 60 journal articles, and wrote several books including a commentary on the Gospel of John for The Catholic Commentary on Sacred Scripture. While teaching a course at Franciscan University, Martin helped inspire Mary Healy to pursue biblical studies. Later, Martin collaborated with Healy, Kenneth L. Schmitz, and Bob Schuchts to develop a symposium on faith healing. He was a bi-ritual priest and had a close friendship with Joseph Raya, a Melkite Catholic archbishop.

While visiting Copenhagen, Denmark, in 2010, Martin suffered a heart attack from which he never recovered completely. He died in 2017 at the age of 86. 22 priests concelebrated his funeral Mass, which was presided over by Bishop Barry Knestout. Martin had once been Knestout's spiritual director. He was buried at All Souls Cemetery in Germantown, Maryland.

== Selected works ==
- Baptism in the Holy Spirit: A Scriptural Foundation (Franciscan University Press, 1986)
- The Feminist Question: Feminist Theology in the Light of Christian Tradition (Wm. B. Eerdmans, 1995)
- The Fire in the Cloud: Lenten Meditations: Daily Reflections on the Liturgical Texts (Charis Books, 2002)
- Sacred Scripture: The Disclosure of the Word (Sapientia Press, 2005)
- The Gospel of John, The Catholic Commentary on Sacred Scripture (Baker Academic, 2015), with William M. Wright IV
- Encountering the Living God in Scripture: Theological and Philosophical Principles for Interpretation (Baker Academic, 2019), with William M. Wright IV
