= Myrtle Sheldon =

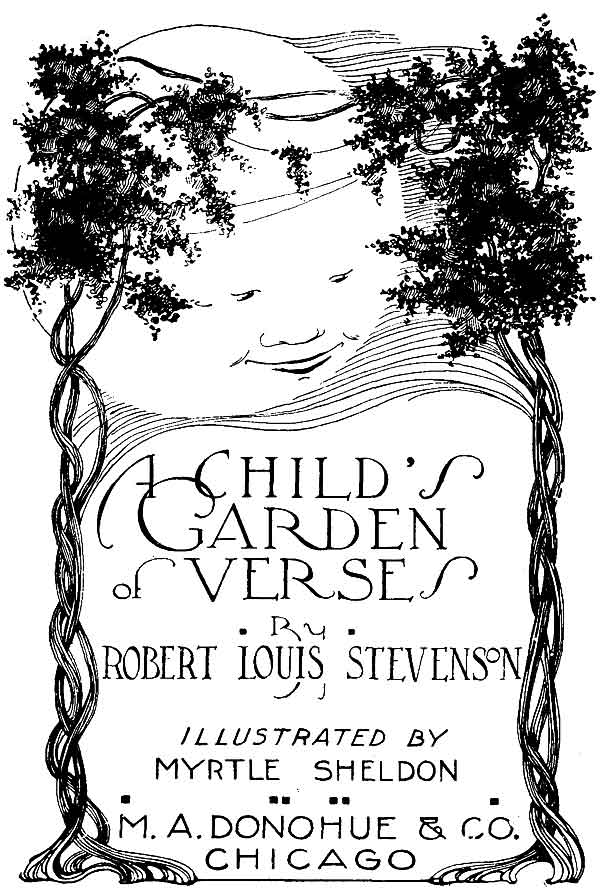
A Child's Garden of Verses (1916) cover

Myrtle Sheldon (19 January 1893 – 24 November 1939) was an American illustrator of children’s books.

Sheldon was born in Menomonee, Waukesha, Wisconsin, United States and died in Cold Spring, New York. She was married to Fridolin Joseph Blumer. Her mother was Estelle Keeler, and her father was J. B. Sheldon. She illustrated many children's books, some without attribution at the time of publication. Those publicly credited include A Child's Garden of Verses by Robert Louis Stevenson, Ellen Tarry's Janie Belle, and the 1932 Newbery Honor-winning children's book Boy of the South Seas by Eunice Tietjens. Tarry’s work was particularly notable, as Janie Belle was one of the first children’s picture books with an African-American author published in the United States.

Actress Kathy Bates listed the Stevenson book as one of her favorites and lauded Sheldon's drawings.

== Works ==
Works illustrated by Sheldon include:

- The Little Lame Prince (1910 edition) by Dinah Maria Mulock Craik and Myrtle Sheldon.
- A Child's Garden of Verses (1916) by Robert Louis Stevenson M.A. Donohue & Co.
- Boy of the South Seas (1931) by Eunice Tietjens. Received the Newbery Honor in 1932.
- Jerry Todd's Up-The-Ladder Club (1937) and Jerry Todd's Poodle Parlor (1938) both by Leo Edwards
- Mary and Marie (1938) by Helen Valentine
- Harry, the Horse (1939) by Joan Mosely
- We Call it Human Nature (1939) by Paul Grabbe
- Ginger Blue (1940) by Charles Morrow Wilson
- Janie Belle (1940) by Ellen Tarry
