= Joseph Breen =

American journalist and film censor (1888–1965)

- Born: Joseph Ignatius Breen; October 14, 1888; Philadelphia, Pennsylvania, U.S.
- Died: December 5, 1965 (aged 77); Los Angeles, California, U.S.
- Resting place: Holy Cross Cemetery, Culver City
- Education: Gesu Parish School; Saint Joseph's College
- Occupations: journalist, film censor
- Years active: 1934–1955
- Spouse: Mary Dervin (m. 1914–1965)
- Children: 6

Joseph Ignatius Breen (October 14, 1888 – December 5, 1965) was an American journalist and film censor with the Motion Picture Producers and Distributors of America who applied the Hays Code to film production.

== Early life and career ==
Breen was the youngest of three sons born to Mary and Hugh A. Breen in Philadelphia. His father had emigrated from Ireland and met his mother Mary in New Jersey. Breen was raised in a strict Roman Catholic home and attended Gesu Parish School until the eighth grade. He then attended Boys Catholic High School. He attended Saint Joseph's College but dropped out after two years, after which he worked as a newspaper reporter for fourteen years in Philadelphia, Washington, D.C., and Chicago. After working as a reporter, Breen worked for the United States Foreign Service for four years, serving in Kingston, Jamaica, and in Toronto, Canada.

In 1926, he served as the publicity director for the 28th International Eucharistic Congress in Chicago.

== As film censor ==
=== 1934–1941 ===
Breen was a journalist and an "influential layperson" in the Catholic community. Breen worked for Will H. Hays as a "troubleshooter" as early as 1931.

In 1933, the Roman Catholic National Legion of Decency was founded, and began to rate films independently, putting pressure on the industry. In 1933 and 1934 the Legion along with a number of Protestant and women's groups launched plans to boycott films that they deemed immoral. The Motion Picture Producers and Distributors of America (MPPDA) had, up until then, enforced the motion picture industry's own self-censorship standards, albeit not very seriously. Hays, who had been in charge of enforcing this voluntary code since 1927, worried that the NLD's efforts could weaken his own power and that of his office, and hurt industry profits.

Hays appointed the "tough Irish Catholic" Breen to head the Production Code Administration (PCA), a newly created department of the MPPDA, created to administer the Motion Picture Production Code. Unlike previous attempts at self-censorship, PCA decisions became binding — no film could be exhibited in an American theater without a stamp of approval from the PCA. Any producer attempting to do so faced a fine of $25,000.

After ten years of unsuccessful voluntary codes and expanding local censorship boards, the studio approved and agreed to enforce the codes, and the nationwide production code was enforced starting on July 1, 1934. Liberty Magazine wrote in 1936 that Breen's appointment gave him "more influence in standardizing world thinking than Mussolini, Hitler, or Stalin."

Breen wrote antisemitic letters in the early 1930s including phrases like "Ninety-five percent of these folks are Jews of an Eastern European lineage. They are, probably, the scum of the scum of the earth". After 1934, he was "publicly and forthrightly anti-antisemitic." He occasionally collaborated with Georg Gyssling, the Nazi representative in Hollywood.

William Dudley Pelley, founder of the antisemitic organization the Silver Legion of America, believed that Jews controlled the movie industry, which he thought to be the "most effective propaganda medium in America", during the 1930s. Hence he applauded the fact that Breen had assumed the power to censor Hollywood. Breen, who also expressed antisemitic views, was deeply worried that Jewish filmmakers would try to use Nazi mistreatment of Jews during the 1930s as a vehicle for propaganda. He was concerned that Germans would be offended by harsh depiction of Nazis. He specifically warned Hollywood producers to avoid the topic altogether, saying that "[t]here is a strong pro-German and antisemitic feeling in this country ... and while those who are likely to approve of an anti-Hitler picture may think well of such an enterprise, they should keep in mind that millions of Americans might think otherwise." Breen claimed that plans to make such pictures were being coordinated through the Hollywood Anti-Nazi League, which he claimed was "conducted and financed almost entirely by Jews". Breen pressured Metro-Goldwyn-Mayer to drop plans to film Sinclair Lewis's best-selling anti-fascist novel, It Can't Happen Here after insisting on 60 edits with more to follow. He also asked MGM in 1938 to change the villain from Nazis in the adaptation of the anti-Nazi novel Three Comrades in order to "get away from the suggestion that we are dealing with Nazi violence or terrorism."

Breen did not issue a statement against antisemitism until July 1939, which said, in part, "In my judgement there is nothing more important for us Catholics to do at the present moment than to use our energies in stemming the tide of racial bigotry and hostility." This followed statements in late 1938 by Pope Pius XI denouncing antisemitism, stating that "it is not possible for Christians to take part in antisemitism" as well as the newly formed Committee of Catholics to Fight Anti-Semitism. The two authors of the Hays Code, Martin J. Quigley and the Rev. Daniel Lord, SJ, promoted the cause. Quigley asked Breen to help gather statements of support from Catholics in the Hollywood film industry.

=== 1941–1954 ===
Breen resigned from the PCA in April 1941, attributing his departure to "overwork and the need of a long rest." He briefly put in a stint as the general manager of RKO Pictures, but returned to the PCA in 1942.

By the mid-1950s, Breen's power over Hollywood was diminishing. For instance, Samuel Goldwyn publicly insisted that the production code be revised. Around the same time, Howard Hughes, owner of RKO, released The French Line, featuring revealing images of actress Jane Russell in a bathing suit, despite the fact that Breen had refused to approve the picture for release.

In 1951, Breen's office refused to approve Otto Preminger's film The Moon Is Blue because of objections to the dialogue. United Artists backed Preminger in his decision to release the movie without Breen's approval.

In 1954, the same year he retired, in responding to these events in an interview with Aline Mosby, Breen claimed that "after the events of the past 10 months — The French Line, The Moon Is Blue and Goldwyn — the code is more entrenched than ever before. Those events brought tremendous support from groups all over the country." Breen retired from the PCA and was replaced by Geoffrey Shurlock. On his retirement, he was presented with an honorary Academy Award for "his conscientious, open-minded and dignified management of the Motion Picture Production Code".

== Personal life ==
In February 1914, Breen married Mary Dervin, with whom he had six children, three boys and three girls. Their son Joseph Breen Jr. was a writer and director. One of their other children, Thomas, whose right leg was amputated due to a combat injury on Guam during World War II, was cast in a feature role in Jean Renoir's 1950 film The River, playing a wounded war veteran. Renoir was not aware at the time that Thomas was Joseph Breen's son.

After his retirement, Breen moved to Phoenix, Arizona, with his wife Mary. He suffered from poor health in his later years and eventually lost the use of his legs. He died at the age of 77 on December 5, 1965, at the Brentwood Convalescent Home in Los Angeles and was buried at Holy Cross Cemetery, Culver City.

== Legacy ==
After Breen's death, Variety magazine wrote that Breen was "one of the most influential figures in American culture" and that "more than any single individual, he shaped the moral stature of the American motion picture." The trade magazine went on to say that Breen enforced the PCA code "with a potent mix of missionary zeal and administrative tenacity."

In the 2004 film The Aviator, Breen was portrayed by Edward Herrmann.

== See also ==
- Nazism and cinema
