= Ellen Tarry =

- Born: September 26, 1906; Birmingham, Alabama, United States
- Died: September 23, 2008 (aged 101); New York, New York, United States
- Occupation: Author
- Writing career
- Period: 1940–2008

Ellen Tarry (September 26, 1906 – September 23, 2008) was an African-American journalist and author who figured in the Harlem Renaissance. Her Janie Belle (1940) was the first African-American picture book, and her other works include further literature for children and young adults as well as an autobiography.

== Biography ==
Tarry was born in Birmingham, Alabama. Although raised in the Congregational Church, she converted to Catholicism in 1922, after years of attending the St Francis de Sales school for girls on the former Belmead plantation property in Virginia. She was taught there by the Sisters of the Blessed Sacrament.

She thereafter attended Alabama State Normal School, now Alabama State University, and became a teacher in Birmingham. At the same time, she began writing a column for the local African-American newspaper entitled "Negroes of Note", focusing on racial injustice and racial pride.

In 1929, she moved to New York City in hope of becoming a writer. There she befriended such Harlem Renaissance literary figures as Langston Hughes, Claude McKay and Countee Cullen. She was the first "Negro Scholarship" recipient at the Bank Street College of Education in New York City, where she met and became friends with Margaret Wise Brown and was influenced by the "here and now" theory of picture book composition.

Tarry published four picture books: Janie Belle (1940), illustrated by Myrtle Sheldon), 1942's Hezekiah Horton (illustrated by Oliver Harrington), 1946's My Dog Rinty in collaboration with Caldecott Medal winner Marie Hall Ets (photographs by Alexander and Alexandra Alland), concerning a Harlem family and their mischievous pet, and 1950's The Runaway Elephant (again illustrated by Harrington), which continued the relationships started in Hezekiah Horton.

Tarry's The Third Door: The Autobiography of an American Negro Woman (from 1955) tells of her life in the South (including her time at the SBS school in Virginia), her migration to New York City, her friendship with McKay, and her deep commitment to Catholicism. In 1942, Tarry was one of the first two co-directors along with Ann Harrigan Makletzoff, at the request of Catherine de Hueck Doherty, of the Chicago branch of Friendship House, a Catholic outreach movement promoting interracial friendship. It offers a thoughtful eyewitness view of life in Alabama and Harlem from the 20s through the early 50s, a pivotal era in the evolution of race relations. Her involvement with USO during the Second World War opens a window on the experience of mobilization and the later integration of the military. The book's concluding chapter recounts a drive from Harlem to Birmingham and back in the immediate aftermath of the 1954 Supreme Court desegregation decision.

Tarry's biographies include Katherine Drexel: Friend of the Neglected, Pierre Toussaint: Apostle of Old New York, The Other Toussaint: A Post-Revolutionary Black, and Martin de Porres, Saint of the New World.

Tarry died on September 23, 2008, three days before her 102nd birthday.

== Personal life ==
She had one daughter, Elizabeth Tarry Patton, from a brief marriage.

== See also ==
- Friendship House
