= Mother of God Community =

Catholic community located in Washington, D.C., U.S.

- Formation: 1966
- Founder: Edith Difato, Judith Tydings
- Type: Catholic charismatic community
- Headquarters: Gaithersburg, Maryland, United States
- Region served: Washington, D.C. metropolitan area
- Members: ~100 covenant members, ~150 affiliates
- Official language: English
- Parent organization: Roman Catholic Archdiocese of Washington
- Website: motherofgod.org

Mother of God Community is a Catholic and ecumenical charismatic community located in the Washington, D.C. metropolitan area of the United States. The Community office and grounds is located in Gaithersburg, Maryland. Under the Canon Law of the Catholic Church, the Community is recognized as a "private association of the faithful" with its governing statutes approved by the Archbishop of Washington. In addition the Community is a member of the Catholic Charismatic Renewal International Service (CHARIS) established in the Vatican by the Holy See. The Community is also a founding member of the Association of Ecclesial Movements and New Communities in the Roman Catholic Archdiocese of Washington as well as the North American Network of Charismatic Covenant Communities. Individual members of the Mother of God Community believe they are called to live out the Gospel of Jesus Christ and to grow in the knowledge of God through daily prayer, fellowship, evangelization, and service to the Church. Membership is open to Christians from all walks of life – families, couples, priests, and singles, college students, seminarians, and retired people. There are members and affiliate members, but only about a dozen members actually live in the Community's large residential house.

== Origins ==
The Mother of God Community began in 1966 right after the close of Vatican II, when various housewives, particularly Edith Difato (1924 - ) and Judith Tydings, and other individuals within Our Lady of Mercy Catholic Church in Potomac, Maryland, began experiencing a new awakening of the Holy Spirit and of God's love in their lives. They began meeting daily after Mass and read the documents of Vatican II and other works about the role of the Holy Spirit in both the lives of saints and in those of ordinary people. The first recorded prayer meeting took place on June 7, 1968, in the parish hall of Our Lady of Mercy parish in Potomac, Maryland with more than 90 persons in attendance. It is considered by many as the first prayer meeting in the Eastern part of the U.S. of the movement which would later be called the Catholic Charismatic Renewal, for it was shortly thereafter that participants began hearing about similar prayer meetings and outpourings of the Spirit in places like Duquesne University in Pittsburgh, Pennsylvania, South Bend, Indiana, Ann Arbor, Michigan and other cities. The prayer group in Potomac, which is within the Archdiocese of Washington, began communicating with these and other groups and soon Catholic Charismatic prayer groups began springing up throughout the U.S. and eventually all over the world. The group in Potomac became a catalyst for the start of other new prayer groups within the Washington, D.C. area and in other regions.

On March 24, 1971, the budding community was formally incorporated in the state of Maryland under the name Potomac Charismatic Community, Inc. In 1972 the name "Mother of God Community" was chosen; reflecting the Community members' desire to be like Mary, the Mother of God, who received Christ and became a vessel for sharing his life. The legal name, however, is still Potomac Charismatic Community, Inc. As the group grew to several hundred in number, it required more structure. A pastoral team was formed made up of lay people and priests. Joseph (Joe) Difato, Edith's eldest son, became the coordinator of a small pastoral team. In the mid-1970s, in order to live closer to one another in affordable homes (largely townhouses), members of the Community began to move to the newly built town of Montgomery Village, which adjoins Gaithersburg, Maryland.

The first Mother of God Community Covenant was signed by members in 1974. The Community covenant, although revised over time, still includes a commitment to pray daily, to examine one's conscience and repent from sin, to read scripture, to attend prayer meetings regularly, to participate in MOG activities, to love and support one another, to support the Community financially according to one's means, and to do other related matters. Members of the community include married couples, young people, older singles, housewives, priests, and consecrated religious. Most all of the members are Catholic, but Christians from other traditions have always been welcome and each member is expected to attend a Sunday worship service or Mass. Many community members assist their local parish as extraordinary ministers of Holy Communion, lectors, sacristans, choir members, parish council members, deacons, and other ministries.

As in most Catholic Charismatic groups, the primary focal point for the Community has always been the large open praise and worship meeting held weekly. These meetings are times of worship, singing, sharing, and openness to the manifestation of the gifts of the Spirit, especially "word" gifts: prophecy, the word of knowledge, speaking and singing in tongues, etc. Healing prayer and intercessory prayer are also part of these meetings. A teaching or exhortation may also be given at the praise and worship meeting.

== Past structure ==
From 1974 to 1995 the coordinators of the Community were Edith Difato and Joe Difato. There was a core team of 12 people in leadership positions and a number of priests who were living in the community. In the 1970s the Community was divided into three geographic regions (Potomac, Rockville, and Montgomery Village) and later, when most members had moved to Montgomery Village the regions were divided somewhat by age or state in life. Each region had a coordinator. There were also heads of various community ministries and small men and women support groups. At its height in the 1980s Community membership numbered some 500 or more individuals.

== Community school and property ==
In order to provide a Catholic school for their children, in 1987 community members voted to purchase a wedge-shaped piece of land along Goshen Road on the northern perimeter of Montgomery Village. The Mother of God School opened that fall in an unused public school building in the Aspen Hill area of Montgomery County, Maryland, and two years later the School was transferred to a newly built three-story structure on the purchased property in Gaithersburg, Maryland.

The third level of the building was largely devoted to office space and the other two stories housed the classrooms and workspaces of the school, Kindergarten through 8th grade. A few years later a building with four classrooms and large gym with a vaulted ceiling was added to the school. The gym is not only used by the school, but also been a place of worship for Eastern Catholic or Orthodox Christian communities on Sunday mornings. In addition it houses the Community's weekly praise and worship meeting on Sunday evenings; Encounter School of Ministry DC Campus classes; conferences; and other activities and events. The Mother of God School is open to all children and, although an independent private Catholic School, it is affiliated with the Archdiocesan School System and has a sizable pre-K program.

At the same time that the school was built there was erected on the property a three-story, monastic like residence which contains six apartments, a large chapel, living room, class room, library, and a common kitchen and dining room. The residence, known as “Goshen House”, is the center for many community gatherings and has been the home of various lay people, priests, and consecrated religious who have felt called to live together.

It is a coincidence that the Mother of God Community property is directly across the street from a parish site, St. John Neumann Catholic Church, where most Community members actively participate and attend weekly (and often daily) Catholic Mass.

== The Word Among Us ==
As the Community grew new methods of evangelization were explored. The first edition of The Word Among Us, a monthly Christian magazine, was published in December 1981 by members of the Mother of God Community who hand stapled the first copies together. The magazine gradually grew and was eventually translated into several languages and distributed worldwide.

The original format of the magazine was simple. It consisted of feature articles and daily meditations based upon the readings of the day in the Catholic Church. Articles and meditations were originally written by members of the Mother of God Community. It also carried, at one time, the Imprimatur from the Archdiocese of Washington which increased its appeal to its predominantly Roman Catholic audience. After the reorganization of the Mother of God Community in 1996, offices were moved to Frederick County, Maryland and into the boundaries of the Archdiocese of Baltimore.

== Assessment by the Archdiocese ==
From its earliest days the community enjoyed good relations with the Roman Catholic Church and the Archdiocese of Washington. By the early 1990s Mother of God Community began looking into the possibility of the Community being recognized as a Catholic "private association of the faithful." Under the guidance of Fr. Theo Rush the Community won provisional recognition from the archdiocese in 1993. Permanent status required a review of the group's statutes and operations and many Community members volunteered to be on a committee to draft statutes for the governance of the Community.

In 1994, under the instructions of Cardinal James A. Hickey, a self-assessment was begun as well as an outside assessment by one of his advisers, Sister Elizabeth McDonough. For the self-assessment Community leaders designed and gave a 135 question survey to its members and former members were also invited to participate. The results of the survey were overwhelmingly positive. In the survey respondents spoke about the way the life in the community changed their lives, helped their families, and renewed their Catholic faith. For the outside assessment members and former members were invited to speak privately with Sister McDonough. Private meetings with Sister McDonough (which remain anonymous) were not so positive and many members and former members shared stories of overreaching control by community leaders. There were complaints of arranged marriages, over-scrutiny and direction of members' personal, financial and family life, marginalization of non-conforming members, and so on.

At the same time, some former members of the Community invited persons associated with Cult Awareness Network to begin meeting with current and former members. At the meetings some alleged that Community leaders had engaged in both financial abuses and in "cult-like abuses" such as the abuse of authority, groupthink, adulated leadership, elitism, and marginalization of nonconforming members. A comprehensive audit in 1997 did not substantiate allegations of financial abuses, but allegations of "cult-like-abuse," due to their anecdotal nature, proved difficult to prove or disprove. However, some members or former members felt that their lives were overly structured.

Tensions came to a head when, on the evening of Sunday, May 21, 1995, at a Mother of God prayer meeting, Judith Tydings, Edith Difato's co-founder, stood up and related about her own marginalization within the Community and read sections of a letter written by former Community member, Fr Tom Weinandy, which outlined his thoughts on the positive and negative aspects of the community. She recommended that there be new leadership and that an interim body be appointed.

== Re-organization ==
On Saturday, September 23, 1995, the Archdiocese of Washington announced it wanted to make changes of leadership in Mother of God Community. Cardinal Hickey visited the community, first holding a private meeting with the Difatos and then a public address to several hundred community members.

In Cardinal Hickey's public address, he called the Community "a gift from the Lord" that allowed members "to take your faith much more seriously, to grow in your relationship with the Lord Jesus Christ." However, Hickey raised concerns about the teaching, pastoral practices and leadership of the Community.

Firstly, the Cardinal raised concerns about Community teachings, citing that many were too Protestant, or not Catholic enough. However, Mass was celebrated each day in the MOG chapel and the Sacraments of Reconciliation, First Communion, Confirmation and Marriage were administered by the priests of the community. He expressed concern about the Community's teaching especially with regard to baptism in the Spirit and its relationship with the seven sacraments of the Church; the centrality of the Eucharist to Catholic worship rather than just prayer meetings; the authentic Catholic understanding of the essential goodness of creation and the dignity of the human person in that though men are sinners even those who are not yet in the Church are not evil or depraved; the sacrament of marriage and equality of spouses; and some aspects of the Toronto Blessing such as being 'slain in the Spirit' or resting in Spirit which was being practiced by many in the Community at the time.

Secondly, he had concerns with the pastoral practices of the Community. Lay people within the Community, he said, had too much personal authority over other people's lives. Hickey said that because of Mother of God's pastoral practices, members were led to speak of very personal things in a manner that did not protect their right to privacy and confidentiality and which left them vulnerable. Furthermore, he requested that anyone who had personal information about other members-"in notebooks, in computer files, in whatever form, that you destroy it, lest it be the source of future embarrassment or harm."

Lastly, Cardinal Hickey reiterated the request he made in 1993 that the leadership be changed and he appointed some interim leaders who were charged with responsibility to lead the Community until such time as new leaders were formally elected under Community statutes that were finalized and approved by the archdiocese. After the Cardinal's address, many members left the Community. Some formed a new community outside of the Archdiocese called the Triumph of the Cross. After a while many other Community members also left leaving perhaps 100 members. A year later, on Wednesday, February 14, 1997, a much smaller Mother of God Community, operating under new procedures, a more democratic leadership, won formal approval from the Archdiocese of Washington. Since the Community's restructuring allegations of abuse in the Community have discontinued.

== Structure and leadership ==
Mother of God Community (MOG) is recognized within the Archdiocese of Washington as a "Private Association of the Faithful." This means religious vows or consecrated life is not required to be a member and affiliation or membership is totally voluntary. This is a canonical designation (under the Code of Canon Law of the Catholic Church) which indicates that a religious organization is "officially approved" for participation by Catholics. The process of obtaining this recognition included the writing of statutes governing the life of the community and the holding of elections for the community leadership. The community is still approved by the Archdiocese of Washington under its archbishop, Cardinal Wilton Gregory, and is active participant in the meetings and events sponsored by the Association of Ecclesial Movements and New Communities in the Archdiocese of Washington.

Under its approved statutes the Mother of God Community is led by its Pastoral Council composed of six members each elected by the covenant members of the Community to a four-year, staggered term with two members coming up for election every two years. The Council elects a coordinator of the Community. For a number of years the Coordinator had been noted scripture scholar and consecrated lay woman Dr. Mary Healy, SSL, STL. However, in June 2008, Dr. Healy left her position in the Community to become an assistant professor of Sacred Scripture at Sacred Heart Major Seminary in Detroit, Michigan. Hall Miller, a local businessman and longtime member of the Community was then elected Coordinator. In June 2014 Hall Miller stepped down to become full-time President of the Mother of God School and Tom Singer, another longtime member, was elected as Coordinator in his place. In 2022, after serving two four year terms as Coordinator, Tom Singer stepped down and Mark Gargulinski was elected as Coordinator by the Council. Serving with the Coordinator on the Pastoral Council are five other elected members. Although covenant members, which number less than 100, are the only ones who vote there are probably some 150 other individuals who have affiliate membership or are considered "friends" of the community and are sent Community e-mails.

== Priests and scholars associated with the community ==
The Mother of God Community has always attracted numerous priests and scholars as in-resident members for a period of time or as friends or affiliate members.

Until his passing in 2017 the Community Chaplain and Spiritual Advisor in-residence was the noted Catholic priest, scholar, author and professor, Fr. Francis Martin (SSL, STD, STL) formerly professor at Sacred Heart Seminary in Detroit, the Dominican House of Studies in Washington DC and the John Paul II Institute for Marriage and Family also in DC. His lectures from Mother of God can be found on the Word Proclaimed Institute's website.

Other priests who have been members of the Community include Fr. Fred Close, Pastor of St. Anthony of Padua parish in Northeast Washington, D.C., Fr. Theo Rush, a Franciscan priest and Canon lawyer from Australia; Msg. Peter Hocken, a British priest and noted author/historian about the Charismatic and Pentecostal Renewal; Fr. Thomas Weinandy, Fr. Mike Duggan, Fr. Gerard Beigel, Fr. Steve O'Donnell, and many others.

Other scholars and friends of the Community include the Jesuit priest, Fr. Peter Ryan (STD), professor at Sacred Heart Seminary in Detroit, Fr. Jim McCormack, Fr. Diogo Escuderro, Fr. Jason Lewis, and Dr. John Grabowski, Associate Professor of Moral Theology at Catholic University.

== Mother of God ministries and activities ==
The Mother of God Community website and weekly bulletins list and describe a variety of ministries and activities including the running of the Mother of God School (pre-K thru 8th grade); occasional Masses; Sunday night praise and worship meetings, women's groups and retreats, men's groups and retreats, children's catechesis, the Mother of God Community Home School Program, scouting programs, coordinating or facilitating seminars in Life in the Spirit or Christ's Life series, sponsoring or facilitating healing conferences with Damian Stayne from Cor et Lumen Christi Community in England, hosting the Encounter School of Ministry DC Campus, and other activities. Members and affiliate members of the Community have also founded ministries or taken leadership roles in ongoing ministries including the Word Proclaimed Institute, Word for Life Rosary Mission, Blessed Hope Communications, St. Paul Street Evangelization, St. Vincent de Paul Society, pro-life activities, missions to South Sudan and China, sponsoring weekly youth gatherings and helping youths attend the annual Steubenville Youth Conference, and other activities.
