= Boy of the South Seas =

Novel by Eunice Tietjens

- Author: Eunice Tietjens
- Illustrator: Myrtle Sheldon
- Language: English
- Genre: Children's literature
- Publication date: 1931
- Publication place: United States

Boy of the South Seas is a children's novel written by Eunice Tietjens and illustrated by Myrtle Sheldon. It tells the story of 10-year-old Teiki of the Marquesas Islands who, after accidentally stowing away on a visiting ship, makes a new life on the island of Moorea. The book earned a Newbery Honor in 1932.
