= Joseph Raya =

Lebanese Melkite Catholic archbishop

His Excellency, The Most Reverend Joseph Raya
- Archeparch of Akka
- Church: Catholic church (Melkite)
- See: Eparchate of Akko, Haifa, Nazareth and All Galilee
- In office: October 20, 1968 – July 13, 1974
- Predecessor: Archbishop George Hakim
- Successor: Archbishop Maximos Salloum

Orders
- Ordination: July 20, 1941
- Consecration: Patriarch Maximos V Hakim

Personal details
- Born: August 15, 1916 Zahlé, Lebanon
- Died: June 10, 2005 (aged 88) Barry's Bay, Ontario, Canada

Joseph Raya (Arabic: يوسف رايا) (15 August 1916 – 10 June 2005) was a Lebanese-born Melkite Catholic prelate who served as Archeparch of Akka from 1968 to 1974. He was also a theologian and civil rights advocate.

Raya was particularly known for his commitment to seeking reconciliation between Christians, Jews and Muslims. He was also a leading advocate of celebrating the Divine Liturgy in vernacular languages.

== Life ==
=== Early life ===
Joseph-Marie Raya was born to Almez and Mikhail Raya of Zahle and was the seventh of eight children. After finishing his elementary education at the Oriental College he studied in Paris before entering St. Anne's seminary in Jerusalem in 1937. He was ordained a priest of the Melkite Catholic Church on 20 July 1941. He later taught at the Patriarchal College on Queen Nazli Street in Cairo. Raya was expelled from Egypt in 1948 by King Farouk for defending the rights of women. He emigrated to the United States in 1949.

=== Birmingham and the civil rights movement ===
After serving as assistant pastor of St. Ann's Melkite Catholic Church in Woodland Park, New Jersey, he was appointed pastor of St. George Melkite Greek Catholic Church in Birmingham, Alabama, in 1952. His championing civil rights brought him into close friendship with Rev. Martin Luther King Jr. Raya marched several times at King's side and suffered three times at the hands of the Ku Klux Klan, including one occasion when he was kidnapped and severely beaten by three Klansmen. Defying the threat of excommunication issued by Roman Catholic Archbishop Thomas Toolen, Raya helped King and other civil rights demonstrators organize protests and marches throughout Alabama during the 1960s. Raya went on to found Saint Moses the Black Mission, the first Eastern Catholic mission for African Americans, located in downtown Birmingham.

He was also very close to social justice activist Catherine Doherty, and he became the first Associate Priest of her Madonna House Apostolate in Combermere, Ontario, Canada, on July 1, 1959. When he became Archbishop of Nazareth, he ordained her husband Eddie Doherty to the priesthood.

=== Advocate of the vernacular for liturgical services ===
As a priest in Alabama, Raya advocated for younger generations to have church services in their own languages and translated the Gospels, Missal, and Byzantine Divine Liturgy into English.

The Latin Catholic Archbishop of Mobile, Thomas Toolen, banned Raya from celebrating the Divine Liturgy in English in December 1959. However, Pope John XXIII intervened in March 1960 at the request of Melkite Patriarch Maximos IV Sayegh to decide the question in favor of the Byzantine custom of celebrating the Divine Mysteries in the vernacular. Raya invited Bishop Fulton J. Sheen, the famous television Catholic personality, to celebrate the Pontifical Byzantine Divine Liturgy in English in 1960 at the Melkite National Convention; Sheen accepted, celebrating the Divine Liturgy in Birmingham on June 26. In 1963 Raya's liturgical translation was declared the official English translation for the Catholic Byzantine rites.

Patriarch Maximos IV recognized Raya's successes by elevating him to the dignity of Grand Archimandrite of Jerusalem and appointing him a member of the Melkite patriarchal delegation to the Second Vatican Council. The church fathers of Vatican II decided to allow widespread use of vernacular in the Catholic Church. After completing his work at Vatican II Raya continued to translate Melkite works into English. In 1968, with Baron José de Vinck of Alleluia Press in New Jersey, he authored Byzantine Daily Worship, a compendium in English of the Divine Liturgy, Office of the Hours, and the sacraments.

=== Episcopate ===
Following his appointment as Archeparch of Akka on October 20, 1968, Raya led a peaceful demonstration of thousands of Arabs and Jews in Israel seeking justice for the villages of Kafr Bir'im and Iqrit in Upper Galilee that had been depopulated in 1948, and then destroyed. Iqrit was the hometown of his second successor, Archbishop Elias Chacour. He sought justice through non-violent means and called upon Palestinians to be good citizens of Israel.

Describing Raya's actions, Father John Catoir wrote in 1969:

They (Christian Arabs) are in no mood for brotherhood talks, but (Raya) commands them to stop hating the Jews, to purge their hearts of hatred and contention which breeds only misery and further suffering.

At the closing session of the Israeli parliament he thundered to the Jewish representatives, alternating between French, Arabic, and English for all to understand, that they have done to the Arabs some of the very same things they themselves lament so bitterly in their own history of persecution.

It is quite a thing to see a living prophet in action, challenging the inflamed passions of ancient enemies.

In August, 1972 he ordered all churches in his eparchy closed one Sunday to mourn for "the death of justice in Israel" as the two villages remained dispossessed. Explaining his position, Raya said:

No end justifies injustice -- even if that end seems to be the good of the state or of a nation. If you base security on denial of justice, no amount of money can guarantee that security. Not even an army as strong as all of the legions of Rome will be able to insure it.

As archbishop, Raya was a controversial figure. While many admired his charismatic style and ecumenical leadership, some Arabs and members of the church hierarchy resented his overtures to Israel. Raya was opposed to the Melkite Holy Synod's proposal to internationalize Jerusalem. He also upset the Vatican with his aggressive campaign for the return of the Bir'im and Ikrit refugees and the sale of church land to impoverished Muslim farmers. Raya's letter of resignation declared that the Church hierarchy forced his decision to leave his post. The government of Israel considered him dangerous, but when he resigned Prime Minister Golda Meir begged him to reconsider.

Raya's resignation came as a shock to many. The local Christian Youth Club collected several thousand signatures asking him to reconsider, and prominent Muslim, Jewish and Christian leaders in Israel and abroad voiced disappointment. Yoram Kaniuk described their thoughts on the archbishop, describing Raya as "incomprehensible. The great majority of people viewed him with suspicion. Because he failed to conform to generally accepted notions ... Unusual people, deeply religious men, men of morals we won't understand. Bishop Raya was out of step. He bore Israel no animosity. He cared for and looked after his spiritual flock." Departing his post, Raya used his final pastoral letter to underscore his ecumenical approach:

I came to the Holy Land to give. And behold! I was overwhelmed by what I received! I came to enrich and purify! And behold! I was the one to be enriched and purified. I loved the family of the Lord. His family are both the Jews and the Arabs. I held the Muslims, the Druze, the Jew, the Christian, everyone believer and unbeliever, in the same embrace.

After resigning his archbishopric on 13 July 1974, Raya moved to Madonna House in Combermere, Ontario, Canada. At some time between his resignation and 1975 he suffered a massive heart attack and had a quadruple bypass operation in Lexington, Kentucky. From his home in Combermere he lectured and wrote on Byzantine spirituality at various places, among them Fordham University's John XXIII Ecumenical Center in The Bronx and the Patriarchal Major Seminary at Raboue in Antelias, Lebanon. He returned to Lebanon in 1985 to assist the Diocese of Beirut with Archbishop Habib Bacha. In 1987 he assumed interim leadership of the Archdiocese of Banias in Marjayoun, Lebanon, which had been destroyed by the 1974 − 1991 Lebanese civil war. He moved back to Canada after the completion of this assignment and retired at Madonna House in 1990. Raya died on 10 June 2005, at St. Francis Memorial Hospital in Barry's Bay, Ontario, Canada.

== Personal life ==
Raya had a close friendship with Francis Martin, a Latin Catholic priest and theologian.

== Books and publications by Joseph Raya ==
Raya authored several books, including hymnals, theological works, and monographs on church history. Most of his publications were written in English. They include:

- Abundance of Love: The Incarnation and the Byzantine Tradition. Educational Services. 1989. ISBN 1-56125-015-5.
- Byzantine Church and Culture. Alleluia Press. February 1992. ISBN 0-911726-55-1.
- Raya, Joseph; de Vinck; Baron José (1969). Byzantine Daily Worship. Alleluia Press. ISBN 0-911726-07-1.
- Christmas: Birth of Our Lord, God and Saviour Jesus Christ and His Private Life. Madonna House Publications. 1997. ISBN 0-921440-45-6.
- Raya, Joseph; de Vinck; Baron José (2001). The Divine and Holy Liturgy of our Father among the Saints, John Chrysostom. Alleluia Press. ISBN 0-911726-64-0.
- Celebration! Reflections on The Divine and Holy Liturgy. Eastern Christian Publications. 2003. ISBN 1-892278-42-1.
- The Eyes of the Gospel. Madonna House Publications. 2006. ISBN 0-921440-96-0.
- Face of God: An Introduction to Eastern Spirituality. God With Us Publications. 1984.
- Metalipsi: Service of Holy Communion without Divine Liturgy. Madonna House Publications.
- Theophany and Sacraments of Initiation. Madonna House Publications. 1993. ISBN 0-921440-36-7.
- Theotokos: Mary, Mother of Our Lord, God and Saviour Jesus Christ. Madonna House Publications. 1995. ISBN 0-921440-40-5.
- Transfiguration of Our Lord and Saviour Jesus Christ. Madonna House Publications. 1992. ISBN 0-921440-29-4.

== See also ==
- Melkite Greek Catholic Church
- Archbishop of Nazareth
- Gregory III Laham
- Elias Chacour
- Madonna House Apostolate
