= Mother of God School =

Location
- 20501 Goshen Road; Gaithersburg, Maryland 20879; United States; 39°11′37″N 77°11′2.5″W

Information
- Type: Private, Coeducational
- Religious affiliation: Roman Catholic
- Established: 1987
- Founder: Mother of God Community
- Principal: Melissa Sloan, M.Ed.
- Grades: Pre-K through 8th
- Average class size: 11
- Colors: Blue, Red, and White
- Mascot: Wolf
- Accreditation: 1999
- Affiliation: Archdiocese of Washington
- Website: http://www.mogschool.com

Mother of God School (MOG) is a Catholic, coeducational private school located in Gaithersburg, Maryland. The school currently enrolls students in pre-kindergarten through 8th grade. It is affiliated with the Roman Catholic Archdiocese of Washington and the Mother of God Community, which was responsible for the school's founding. It is located across the street from the St. John Neumann Roman Catholic Church, but is not officially connected to the parish. The school recently celebrated its 35th anniversary.

== Background ==
Mother of God School was founded in 1987 to help meet the needs of parents with young children in the Mother of God Community. The Community is a group of primarily Catholic laypeople living in Montgomery County, Maryland who have made a commitment to help one another live as intentional disciples of Christ and thus the school also tries to promote a Catholic and Christ-life awareness among in its students and faculty. The current principal is Melissa Sloan and the president is W. Hall Miller.

In the mid 1980s, the Community experienced an influx of younger families who needed to enroll their children in local schools. To help meet these needs, Community members voted to purchase a piece of land along Goshen Road and construct a school. The three-story brick building was built which was joined to a white brick building called "Goshen House" which houses a sizable chapel and living areas for some members of the community. In 1994, the school's second major construction project was completed: a brick building housing a large gym and several classrooms. The gym is used as a sports facility, a cafeteria, a place to hold school plays, a conference and meeting facility, and a place to hold Mass and other prayer services. The buildings face a central courtyard housing a statue of the Virgin Mary which would later be used in the school's annual May Crowning, one of many traditions shared by both the school and community. The students of the school spent two years in an unused public school building nearby before the construction of the Goshen Road campus was completed.

After review of the school, the Archdiocese of Washington determined Mother of God met the diocese's "Policies for Catholic Schools" and accepted it as an affiliated Catholic school. In 1999, the school was first accredited by the Middle States Association of Colleges and Schools. It is currently accredited by the Southern Association of Colleges and Schools. After graduation Mother of God School students have been accepted into magnet programs at surrounding public high schools as well as at many local private high schools including Our Lady of Good Counsel, St. John's Catholic Prep, Connelly School of the Holy Child, Georgetown Prep, Oakcrest and the Academy of the Holy Cross. Graduates have often been awarded scholarships for merit in academics, music and art.

The school currently has around 250 students. The school has a Pre-Kindergarten program for three, four, and five-year-old children. For other grades, the core curriculum includes Religion, Language Arts, Mathematics, Social Studies, and Science. In addition, students in grades K-8 also benefit from classes in Art, Music, Foreign Language, Physical Education, Library, and Computer Science.

== Student Clubs and Activities ==
Mother of God has a number of clubs, including Boy Scouts chapters; a Robotics Club; and a Mathcounts club which has consistently achieved Silver and Gold Level status. The school has a history of Mathcounts competitors who have done well in local competitions, including some who have progressed to the state level. The School also has a Drama Club with annual productions, and a concert band and string ensemble that have bi-annual concerts. The school's "Band" teachers and conductors are members of the Washington Archdiocesan Music Teachers' Council, which provides music lessons and extracurricular band experiences for Catholic schools in the Archdiocese of Washington.

=== Athletics ===
The school's athletic programs currently consists of CYO basketball teams. Cross Country, Track, and Soccer teams have been added recently.

== Traditions ==
GlobalFest Logo

The School has developed certain fundraising and other traditions including its "Race for Education" and GlobalFest traditions. The first encourages students to obtain sponsors for certain running events and the other is an annual multicultural event with selective ethnic foods, related student stage performances, and a silent auction.

=== Globalfest ===
Mother of God School's Globalfest is its biggest annual event. It is frequently attended by large numbers of people from around the county, and is advertised in local newspapers and radio broadcasts. In the fall, the kindergarten through eighth grades are assigned Regional performances from around the globe (the preschool classes are given a state within the U.S.). As spring approaches, classes will begin to make posters and art to display in their homerooms; they will also start practicing a traditional skit, song, or dance from their assigned region. Parents provide traditional food and music on the day of the event, and each class performs. Attendees bid in a silent auction; purchase food and trinkets.

== Notable alumni ==
- Paul Rabil, professional lacrosse player and graduate of Johns Hopkins University
