= Committee of Catholics to Fight Anti-Semitism =

American Christian anti-racist organization

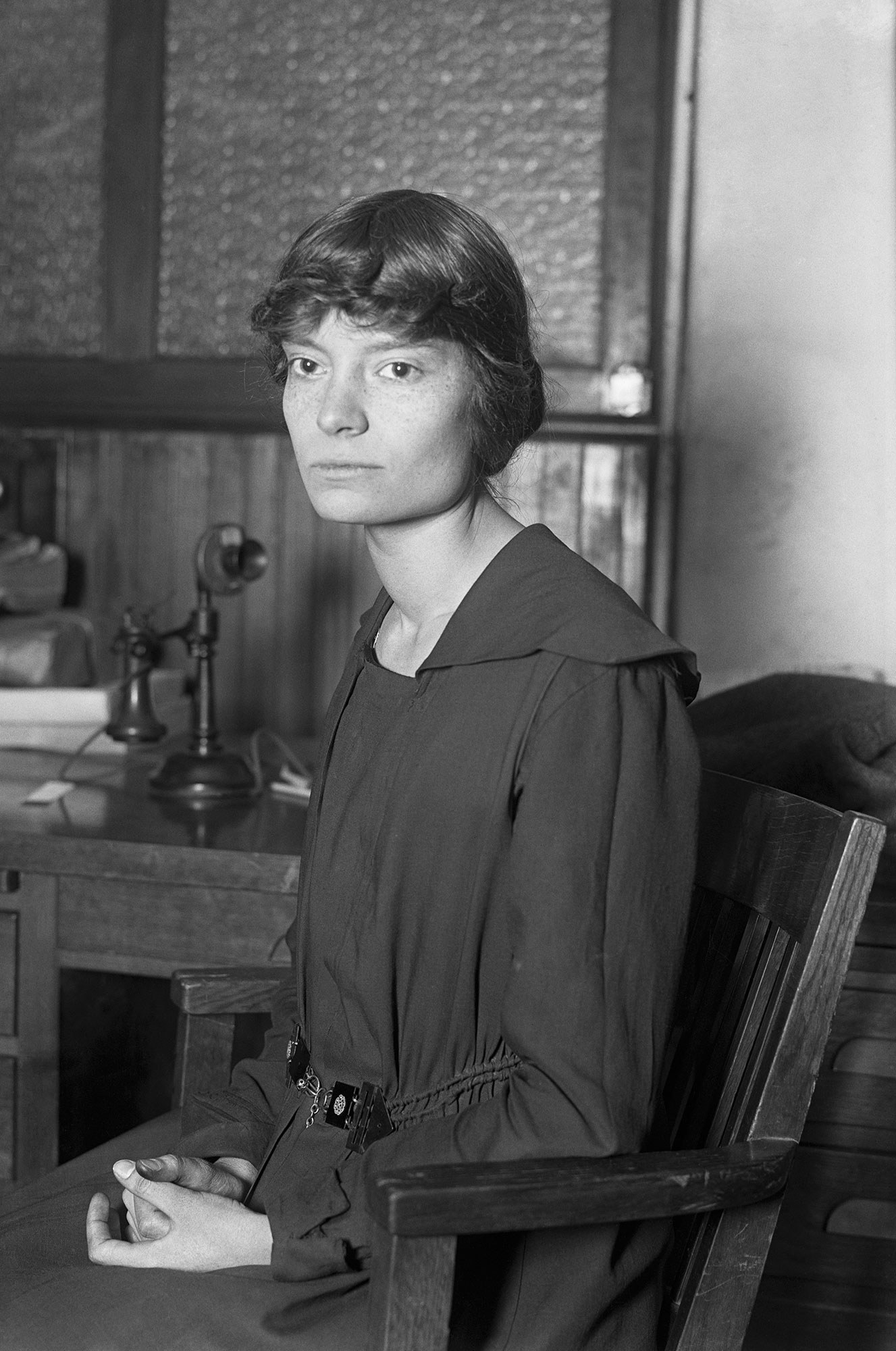
Committee supporter Dorothy Day in 1916

The Committee of Catholics to Fight Anti-Semitism (later known as the Committee of Catholics for Human Rights) was an American Catholic anti-racist organization formed in May 1939, partially in response to the 1938 announcement of Pope Pius XI that "it is not possible for Christians to take part in anti-Semitism". It was supported by many prominent Catholics, including members of the Catholic Worker Movement, among them Dorothy Day.

== Origin ==
In September 1938 Pope Pius XI, speaking to a group of Belgian pilgrims, denounced anti-Semitism explicitly, saying that it was incompatible with Christianity. Influenced by this statement, a group of American bishops released a statement encouraging Catholics to, "guard against all forms of racial bigotry." Inspired by the statement of the bishops, the Committee of Catholics to Fight Anti-Semitism was formed in May 1939 by Dorothy Day, Catherine Doherty, other supporters of the Catholic Worker Movement, and Emmanuel Chapman, professor at Fordham University, who was its first executive secretary. Also included among the founders were artists, philosophers, writers and, according to Day, "a long list of priests and nuns." In August 1939 the group changed its name to the Committee of Catholics for Human Rights.

Millions of citizens throughout the world are no longer considered as inviolable persons: they are mere things to be juggled at will by gangster governments. Atheism, Communism, Nazism, excessive nationalism and arrogant militarism have brought back to the civilized world the servitude of man. The anti-Semite, like the atheist and the Communist, refuses to recognize in his neighbor the image and likeness of God.

— Robert Emmet Lucey, Bishop of Amarillo, writing in The Voice, 1940.

== Membership ==
The American Church hierarchy supported the establishment of the group entirely. By July 1939, Thomas J. Walsh, national commander of the Catholic War Veterans (CWV) and Archbishop of Newark, New Jersey, had joined the committee. At the same time, Edward J. Higgins, CWV founder, and John M. J. Quinn, the national chaplain of the CWV, announced that they would be joining the organization.

In June 1939, boxer Gene Tunney joined the committee. Other notable members were John A. Ryan, Robert F. Wagner, Jr., and Theodore Maynard.

== Mission ==
According to the committee, its purpose was, "primarily to reach those who, contrary to the teachings of Christianity and the principles of democracy, are taking part, unfortunately, in spreading race and minority hatreds in the United States. Our approach will be positive and dignified, and there will be no personal attacks against anyone."

== Activities and branches ==
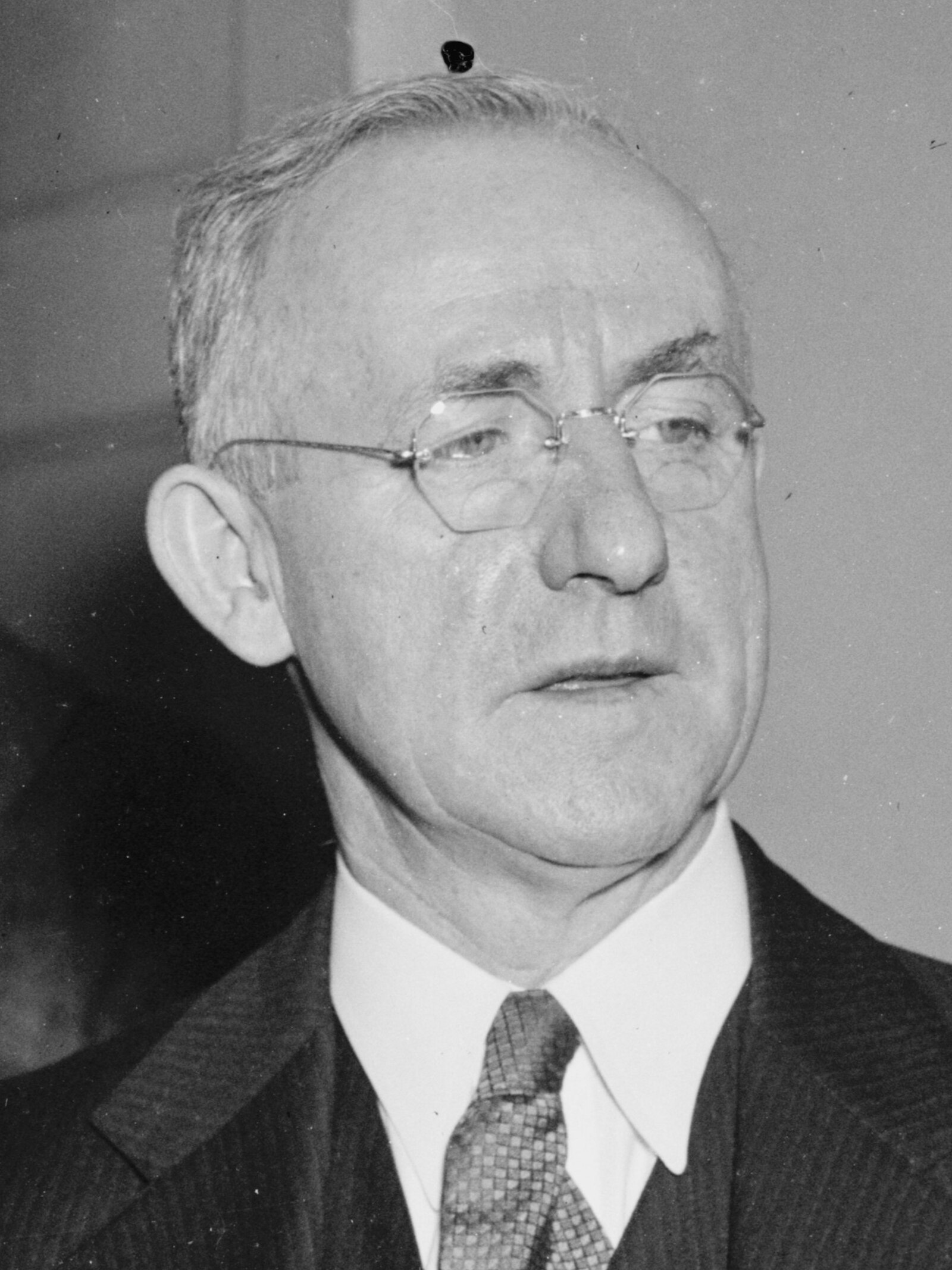
John Brophy in 1937

According to The New York Times the committee's "program of activity consists of frequent issuance of literature, radio broadcasts, speakers' bureaus, educational programs for schools, research bureau, information service, and education of Catholics to combat bigotry and anti-Semitism."

In July 1939, John Brophy, national director of the Congress of Industrial Organizations, gave a speech appealing for the labor movement to support the committee's work, saying that, "anti-Semitism, like every other form of racism and minority hatred, has a real place in the plans of un-democratic, un-American forces seeking to dominate our social and political life. It is spread in America today for a definite and carefully plotted purpose." By 1945 Brophy was a member of the executive board of the Committee.

The committee published an eight-page tabloid journal called The Voice. The first copy of the first issue was ceremonially presented to New York City mayor Fiorello La Guardia at the 1939 New York World's Fair. By July, 1939, according to Chapman, over 100,000 copies of the journal had been circulated. According to historian Mary Christine Athans, "The Voice was published in direct opposition to [Father Charles Coughlin's] Social Justice, condemning the antisemitic activities which were rampant at that time."

A branch of the committee was founded in Chicago on July 28, 1939. Thirty Catholic leaders announced the formation of the branch committee, among them Edward Marciniak, elected chairman of the new group, and Marie Antoinette Roulet.

== The Committee of Catholics for Human Rights ==
Freedom of conscience, as written into the Federal Constitution, through the wisdom and foresight of the Fathers has been a guarantee of peace and happiness during all our life as a nation. Any selfish group which would discriminate against any of our fellow citizens because of race or religion would thereby endanger the fundamental rights of all.

— Franklin Roosevelt, President of the United States, writing in The Voice, 1940.

In August 1939, the group changed its name to the Committee of Catholics for Human Rights (CCHR) and the name of their publication to the Voice for Human Rights. According to executive secretary Chapman, "The original aim of the committee was to combat the growing error of racism by bringing before the public the positive Christian doctrines condemning such thought. Since those same doctrines which emphasize the brotherhood of man under the fatherhood of God apply to all races and peoples, we have felt that a broader application of them was imperative."

Truman Commends Ryan Award Winners

Msgr. Ryan was a man of broad sympathies whose heart beat with true compassion for the laboring man and laboring woman and for all who bore heavy burdens; for the underprivileged everywhere. I think it is especially fitting that the award in his name is to be made by an organization which recognizes the dignity of human nature regardless of faith, race, color, or social condition.

— Harry Truman, President of the United States, in a letter commending Bernard J. Sheil and Philip Murray on their receipt of the John A. Ryan award from the CCHR in November 1945

Under its new name the committee vigorously opposed radio priest and vocal anti-Semite Coughlin's organization the Christian Front. They also spoke out against Mississippi senator Theodore Bilbo for opposing Franklin Roosevelt's Fair Employment Practices Committee by using arguments containing "personal attacks that help feed the flames of bigotry and discriminatory practice." Bilbo vowed to respond to the Committee's letter and promised that his reply "would be hot."

In August 1940, the first anniversary issue of The Voice was published. The issue contained messages of support from Eleanor Roosevelt, Wendell Willkie, then-governor of New York Herbert H. Lehman, and President Franklin Roosevelt.

By September 1939, the CCHR had local chapters in Chicago, Cincinnati, Boston, Detroit, Los Angeles, and San Francisco. Former New York State governor Al Smith joined the CCHR in September 1939, stating in a letter to the committee that "no Catholic can be an anti-Semite, because the Catholic Church teaches charity and love of your neighbor."

The CCHR suspended its activities when World War II began. It was revived in 1944. Its reorganization, explained Emmanuel Chapman, "was made urgent by numerous requests from members of the committee who pointed to the resurgence of intolerance at this time." United States Supreme Court Justice Frank Murphy was named honorary chairman of the reorganized committee.

Notable prelate Edwin Vincent O'Hara joined the CCHR in 1944. In November 1945, the CCHR awarded the Monsignor John A. Ryan Award to Congress of Industrial Organizations president Philip Murray and bishop Bernard James Sheil of Chicago, who were consequently commended by President Harry Truman.

== See also ==
- Pontifical Commission for Religious Relations with the Jews
- Pope John Paul II and Judaism
- Dorothy Day
