= Catherine Doherty =

Religious order founder; Servant of God (1896–1985)

Servant of God Catherine Doherty CM
- Doherty in 1970
- Born: Ekaterina Fyodorovna Kolyschkine (in Russian: Екатерина Фёдоровна Колышкина); 15 August 1896; Nizhny Novgorod, Russian Empire
- Died: 14 December 1985 (aged 89); Combermere, Ontario, Canada

Catherine de Hueck Doherty (née Ekaterina Fyodorovna Kolyschkina; August 15, 1896 – December 14, 1985) was a Russian-born Catholic activist who founded the Madonna House Apostolate in 1947. She was a pioneer in the struggle for interracial justice, spiritual writer, lecturer, and spiritual mother to priests and laity.

She was born in Russia to wealthy parents and came to Canada after escaping the Russian Revolution. During the Great Depression, she founded Friendship House, which served the poor in Toronto. After its closure, she opened Friendship House in Harlem, New York, in 1938, serving the needs of the black community there.

In 1947, Catherine and her second husband, Irish American journalist Eddie Doherty, moved to the village of Combermere, Ontario, where the Madonna House Apostolate, a Catholic community of laymen, laywomen, and priests, developed and flourished.

Among her more than thirty books, many of which blended a profound spirituality of East and West, was the spiritual classic Poustinia. "A woman in love with God," she strived and taught others to live the Gospel without compromise.

Doherty's cause for beatification was introduced in 2000, granting her the title Servant of God.

== Early life ==
Shortly before the turn of the 20th century, Catherine was born in Nizhni Novgorod, Russia, to Theodore (Fyodor) and Emma (Thomson) Kolyschkine. Baptized in the Russian Orthodox Church, she received from her parents an upbringing permeated with the riches of Russian Orthodox spirituality as well as an openness to other religions, especially Catholicism.

Catherine spent much of her childhood in countries where her father, a successful international insurance agent, had been posted. In Egypt, she attended the convent school of the Sisters of Sion, where some of the key aspects of her spirituality were formed. The family returned to Saint Petersburg in 1910, and two years later, at the age of 15, Catherine married her first cousin, Baron Boris de Hueck (1889–1947).

At the outbreak of World War I, Catherine served as a nurse at the front, experiencing firsthand the horrors of war. Returning to Saint Petersburg and the Russian Revolution, she escaped with her husband to Finland, where they nearly met death at the hands of Bolshevik peasants. They served with the Allied army in Murmansk, and were evacuated to England in 1919. Later that year, in London, Catherine was received into the Roman Catholic Church.

The couple immigrated to Toronto, where Catherine gave birth to a son, George. To make ends meet, she took menial jobs, was eventually hired as a lecturer on the Chatauqua circuit, and in time became an executive with the Leigh-Emmerich Lecture Bureau in New York City.

== Friendship House ==
Newly prosperous but with her marriage in ruins, and dissatisfied with a life of material comfort, de Hueck began to feel the promptings of a deeper call through a passage that leaped to her eyes each time she opened the Bible: "Arise—go... sell all you possess... take up your cross and follow Me." In 1932, having obtained the blessing of her bishop, she gave away her possessions and went to live in the slums of Toronto. Others, attracted by her radical gospel witness, came to join her, and Friendship House was born. She begged for food and clothing, organized activities for the youth, and countered Communist propaganda with the social encyclicals of the popes.

Beleaguered by misunderstandings and calumny, the Toronto Friendship House was forced to close in 1936. Two years later, with the backing of Fr. John LaFarge SJ, Catherine initiated an interracial apostolate in Harlem, New York, living with and serving the African-American population. As this work expanded to Chicago, Washington, D.C., and Portland, Oregon, Friendship House became well known in the American Catholic Church.

== Personal life ==
Catherine's marriage to Baron Boris de Hueck was one of suffering caused by his emotional abuse and continual, flagrant infidelities. Their union was annulled on March 18, 1943, on the grounds of consanguinity, as they were first cousins. Their son, George, became a businessman, husband, and father, and was ordained a permanent deacon in the Catholic Church. He died in 1991.

On June 25, 1943, Catherine married Eddie Doherty (1890–1975), a well-known Irish-American newspaperman and writer. They took vows of poverty, chastity, and obedience in 1955, and on August 15, 1969, in Nazareth, Eddie was ordained a priest in the Melkite Greek Catholic Church by Archbishop Joseph Raya.

== Madonna House ==
Catherine's marriage and her broader vision of the apostolate were sources of painful disagreement between the Friendship House staff and its foundress. Catherine and Eddie withdrew to Combermere, Ontario, Canada, with the intention of retiring, but once again, people came to join her. A new apostolate called Madonna House came into being. It would prove to be the most lasting and most fruitful phase of her work.

The community grew into an apostolic family of laymen, laywomen, and priests, breathing from the "two lungs," East and West, of the Catholic Church and offering a vision of the gospel lived out in everyday life. In 2022, the Madonna House Apostolate numbered over 200 members, with foundations in Canada and the United States, Europe, Russia, and the West Indies. At the training center in Combermere, guests share the life of the community, learning a Christian family spirit and to incarnate the gospel in everyday life.

Catherine de Hueck Doherty died in Combermere on December 14, 1985, at the age of 89. The cause for her canonization has been officially opened in the Catholic Church, and she has been given the title Servant of God.

== Spirituality (selected aspects) ==
=== The Little Mandate ===
The core of Doherty's spirituality is summarized in a distillation of the gospel which she called "The Little Mandate"—words which she believed she received from God. It reads:

Arise — go! Sell all you possess. Give it directly, personally to the poor. Take up My cross (their cross) and follow Me, going to the poor, being poor, being one with them, one with Me.

Little — be always little! Be simple, poor, childlike.

Preach the Gospel with your life — without compromise! Listen to the Spirit. He will lead you..

Do little things exceedingly well for love of Me.

Love... love... love, never counting the cost

Go into the marketplace and stay with Me. Pray, fast. Pray always, fast.

Be hidden. Be a light to your neighbour's feet. Go without fear into the depth of men's hearts. I shall be with you. Pray always.

I will be your rest.

=== The Vision of the Whole ===
"The vision of the whole," she wrote, "is that every task, routine or not, is of redeeming value because we are united with Christ." All life is thus related to the gospel, to "loving [one's] Beloved" through service to one's neighbor. Through doing little things with intense love, the world is restored to its creator, to God. Human existence, for her, was "a lifelong love affair with God, whereby the human creature continuously responds to this God who first loved us."

=== Breathing with Both Lungs of the Church ===
"I knew in the depths of my heart that, humble and unimportant as I was, a simple refugee from Russia, I too had a share in the healing of this [division]. How it was to be healed, I did not know, except, perhaps, by trying to live my Eastern spirituality and sharing whatever I could with my fellow Roman Catholics."

== Books (partial listing) ==
- Poustinia
- Sobornost
- Strannik
- Urodivoi
- Molchanie
- Bogoroditza
- Living the Gospel Without Compromise
- Dearly Beloved (3 vols.)
- The People of the Towel and the Water
- Soul of My Soul
- Lubov: Heart of the Beloved
- My Russian Yesterdays
- Fragments of My Life
- Grace in Every Season
- Dear Father
- Dear Seminarian
- Dear Sister
- Apostolic Farming
- Beginning Again
- Donkey Bells
- Season of Mercy
- On the Cross of Rejection
- In the Furnace of Doubts
- In the Footprints of Loneliness
- God in the Nitty-Gritty Life
- Light in the Darkness
- Not Without Parables: Stories of Yesterday, Today and Eternity
- Re-entry Into Faith

== Awards ==
- Cross of St. George, for bravery on the Russian Front
- Order of St. Anna, for continuing in the line of duty under attack
- Pro Ecclesia et Pontifice, Papal decoration medal, awarded by Pope John XXIII for "exceptional and outstanding work for the Church and for the Pope", 1960
- Member of the Order of Canada, "for a lifetime of devoted services to the underprivileged of many nationalities, both in Canada and abroad", 1976. In July 2008, the Madonna House Apostolate returned Doherty's Order of Canada insignia to Rideau Hall as a symbolic gesture of protest over the induction of Henry Morgentaler into the order.
- Dame of the Order of Saint John of Jerusalem
- Jules Favre Foundation Award, Académie française
- Woman of the Year, World Union of Catholic Women's Organizations, Rome
- International Mark Twain Society
- Poverello Medal, Franciscan University of Steubenville

== See also ==
- Committee of Catholics to Fight Anti-Semitism
- Eastern Catholic Churches
- Our Lady of Combermere
- Restoration (newspaper)
