= Mary Healy (theologian) =

Catholic theologian and an international speaker

- Education: University of Notre Dame (BA); Franciscan University of Steubenville (MA); Catholic University of America (MA); International Theological Institute (STL); Pontifical Gregorian University (STD)
- Occupations: Professor, speaker
- Theological work
- Main interests: Scriptures, faith healing
- Website: drmaryhealy.com

Mary Healy is a Catholic theologian and an international speaker. She teaches sacred scripture at Sacred Heart Major Seminary in Detroit, Michigan. Her main interests include faith healing, evangelization, and Catholic spirituality. Healy was one of the first women appointed by Pope Francis in 2014 to the Pontifical Biblical Commission.

== Biography ==
Healy, who grew up on Long Island, New York, described her experience of high school as follows: "I went on retreats, attended Bible studies, and was in the parish choir, but I never really learned how to have a prayer life, a daily interaction with the Lord." In 1986, she earned a BA from the University of Notre Dame. After graduating from Notre Dame, she began pursuing an MA in theology from Franciscan University of Steubenville, which she earned in 1998. At Steubenville, Healy took a course with Francis Martin which inspired her to pursue biblical studies. From there she earned an MA in philosophy from the Catholic University of America in 1991, an STL in theology from the International Theological Institute in 1998, and an STD in biblical theology from the Pontifical Gregorian University in 2000.

Healy took a sabbatical in 2014, during which time she became interested in miraculous healings and the theology thereof. During that year, Pope Francis made Healy and two other women the first three women to serve on the Pontifical Biblical Commission which ensures the correct interpretation of the bible. She was reappointed in 2021. Healy also serves on the Pontifical Council for Promoting Christian Unity and chairs the theological commission of the Charismatic Renewal International Service in Rome.

In 2015 she published a book on the topic with Our Sunday Visitor: Healing: Bringing the Gift of God's Mercy to the World. She gave a talk on healing at the 2021 International Eucharistic Congress in Budapest, Hungary.

Healy was a general editor for The Great Adventure Catholic Bible, published by Ascension Press in 2018.

She was honored with the 2025 St.Jerome Award by the Catholic Library Association.

== Views ==
In an interview with Crux, Healy said that women should be involved in the formation of Catholic seminarians. She said, "The presence of faith-filled, spiritually mature women in positions of authority is important for helping young men mature in their masculinity and preventing the development of clericalist attitudes."

Healy supports the Catholic charismatic renewal.

Healy has criticized Catholics' unfamiliarity with the Bible. She said, "As Catholics we've not had a culture of studying the Bible. Many Catholics were brought up with the idea that reading the Bible is something more Protestant."

== Selected works ==
- Men and Women Are From Eden: A Study Guide to John Paul II's Theology of the Body (St. Anthony Messenger Press, 2005)
- The Gospel of Mark (Baker Academic, 2008), as part of the Catholic Commentary on Sacred Scripture
- Healing: Bringing the Gift of God's Mercy to the World (Our Sunday Visitor, 2015)
- Hebrews (Baker Academic, 2016), as part of the Catholic Commentary on Sacred Scripture
- The Spiritual Gifts Handbook: Using Your Gifts to Build the Kingdom (Baker Publishing Group, 2018), with Randy Clark.
- McCaig, Scott, and Mary Healy. (2023). Clothed with Power from on High: A Short Catechesis on Charisms in the Life and Mission of the Church. Frederick, MD: Word Among Us Press.
