= Friendship House =

Missionary movement founded in the 1930s

Friendship House was a Catholic apostolate serving the poor, founded in Toronto in 1934 by Russian-born Catholic lay leader Catherine de Hueck Doherty. After its closure in 1936, de Hueck moved to Harlem, where others again joined her—living among the black community, responding to the needs they encountered, and challenging the racial discrimination of the times. The movement spread to Chicago and other American cities.

In 1947, de Hueck withdrew from active participation. In the 60s and 70s, the focus gradually shifted from social work to interracial justice and social action. Friendship House in Harlem closed in 1960, and the Chicago branch in 2000.

== Beginnings ==
The Friendship House movement was rooted in the spiritual call of its foundress. Born in 1896 to a wealthy Russian family, Catherine de Hueck Doherty underwent the horrors of World War I, the Russian Revolution and Civil War. She and her first husband, Boris de Hueck, came to Canada in 1921, where she experienced grinding poverty. Raised in the Russian Orthodox Church, she had become a Catholic in 1919.

In the early 1930s, de Hueck began to experience a call from God to abandon her newly acquired security and to go live among the poor, sharing their lives, and responding to the needs that presented themselves. There was no model for this in the Catholic Church of the time, but Archbishop Neil McNeil of Toronto believed in her. He asked her to wait a year and then gave her his blessing.

Catherine had conceived her call as a solitary vocation, but when others, attracted by her Christian vision, asked to join her, the archbishop confirmed that this was God's will.

== Friendship House Toronto ==
On September 14, 1934, Friendship House opened its doors in Toronto. The Great Depression was in full swing; the needs were great and were being exploited by Communist activists. Catherine and her associates begged food and clothing. They organized activities for the children and youth, opened a Catholic lending library, offered English classes for immigrants, and meals for the homeless. In answer to the Communist propaganda, she organized study clubs where the social encyclicals of the popes were discussed. Above all, they offered friendship.

In 1936 a Friendship House was opened in Ottawa and shortly after in Hamilton. But Archbishop McNeil had died prior to the Friendship House opening, and his successor, Cardinal James McGuigan, was not supportive. Clashes with local clergy and laity—partly in reaction to Catherine's advocacy of the poor, partly sparked by her inexperience and personality—as well as rumors and outright calumny, led to the closure of Friendship House in 1936.

== Friendship House Harlem ==
At the suggestion of well-known social activist and editor John LaFarge, SJ and of Fr. Paul Francis Watson of Graymoor, in Garrison, New York, Fr. Michael Mulvoy, CSSP, pastor of St. Mark the Evangelist parish in New York's Harlem, invited Catherine to work in his parish. Arriving in February 1938, and with the backing of Cardinal Patrick Hayes, Catherine founded an interracial ministry that would spread to other American cities and become well known in the American Catholic Church.

Friendship House ran an employment center, credit union, and co-op. There was also the Martin de Porres Library, Cub Scout and CYO groups. The young people who joined lived in community among those whom they served and maintained a way of life based on prayer and the sacraments. Motivated by the gospel, they sought to serve Christ in “the least of [his] brothers.”

Through her work, lectures, and writing, Catherine became one of the leading proponents of interracial justice in the pre-civil rights era, challenging Catholic leaders and laity alike to abandon the sin of racial discrimination.

== Friendship House Chicago ==
In 1942 at the request of Auxiliary Bishop Bernard J. Sheil, Friendship House opened a branch in Chicago, headed by Ann Harrigan and Ellen Tarry. However, dissensions caused by personal rifts and differences in vision increased, and these were heightened by Catherine's 1943 marriage to newspaper reporter Eddie Doherty. The situation eventually led to her resignation as Director General and withdrawal to Canada. There another apostolate, Madonna House, would develop and thrive.

== Later history ==
Friendship House continued to grow in the United States until the late 1950s, with new foundations in Washington, D.C. (1948), Portland, Oregon (1951), Shreveport, Louisiana (1953) and others. In the 1950s the Friendship Houses in Portland and in Washington, D.C. changed their affiliation to Madonna House.

As the social climate in the U.S. evolved, Friendship House's work shifted from social welfare to interracial justice and social action, from ‘direct assistance to… working for institutional change,” from “Friendship House as a way of life to the common vocation of all Christians to humanize the social order.” From a faith-based community living in voluntary poverty, it became an organization focused on interracial justice with a hired staff receiving a small salary.

Catherine de Hueck Doherty resigned from the council and executive board in October 1956, severing her association with the American branch. By 1960, Friendship House had become a national movement for interracial justice with headquarters in Chicago. The Harlem house closed that year due to long-standing problems with financial support and management. Declining participation and lack of funds finally led to the closure of Friendship House in Chicago in 2000.

== Others similarly named ==
Catherine de Hueck's Friendship House Apostolate should not be confused with the separate Friendship House Association, which was founded in 1904, and operated a settlement house and community center in Washington D.C. until 2008; nor with the Peoria Friendship House of Christian Service in Peoria, Illinois, also an unrelated entity. to the Friendship House movement founded by Catherine de Hueck Doherty, continues "to serve the poor, homeless, unemployed, The name Friendship House has been adopted by a variety of social service organization providing services as varied as assistance to mothers, the homeless, and American-Indians constituencies.

== See also ==
- Madonna House Apostolate
- Catholic Worker Movement
- Ellen Tarry
- Friendship House (Washington, D.C.)
