= Combermere, Ontario =

Village in Ontario, Canada

Coordinates: 45°21′50″N 77°36′59″W

Location of Combermere in Ontario

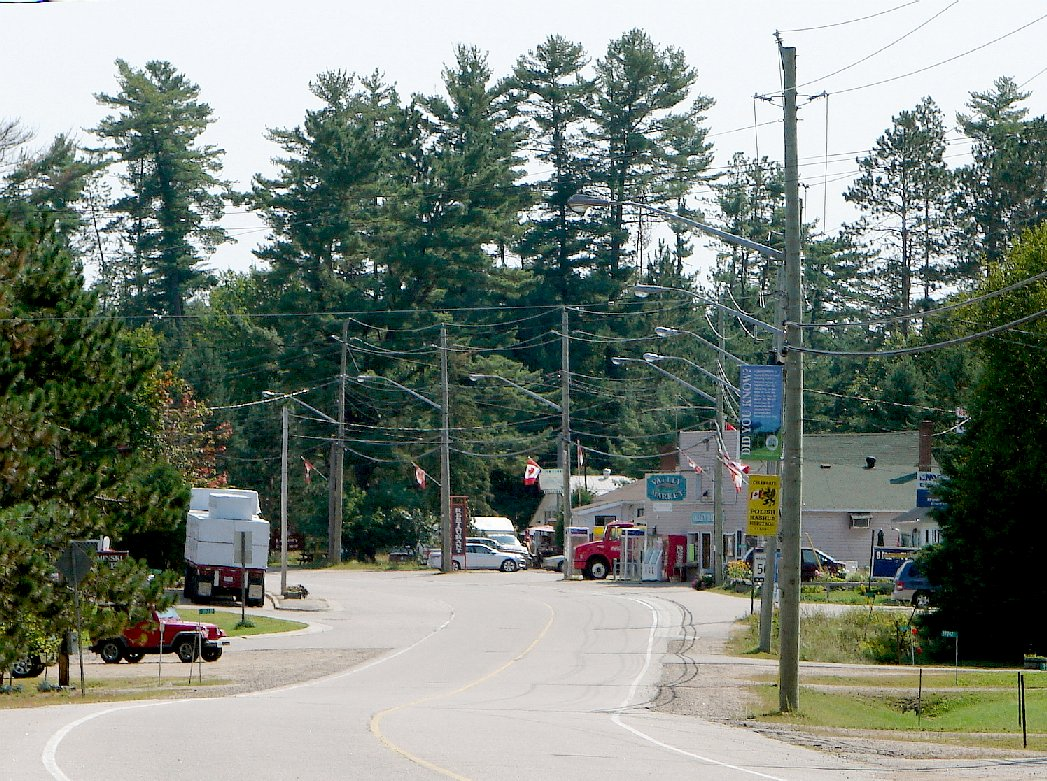
Combermere

Combermere is a village along the Madawaska River in south-eastern Ontario, Canada. It is part of the Township of Madawaska Valley. It was named after Viscount Combermere (1773–1865), a hero of the Napoleonic Wars and other conflicts.

Combermere is best known as home to the Madonna House Apostolate, but the village provides access to numerous lakes and rivers for cottagers and tourists who visit the area. It is home to the Sinking of the Mayflower Steamship lookout, which gives tourists an overlooking view of the lake, where the Mayflower sank on the night of November 12, 1912.

== Climate ==
Extensive damage resulted in the community when a tornado moved through the area during the evening hours of August 2, 2006. Trailers, roofs. and cottages sustained heavy damages with an estimated cost of over one million dollars from the tornado (a strength of F1 according to Environment Canada). A state of emergency was declared in Combermere after the tornado. Acres of land were flattened .and groves of century-old pines were destroyed. The same storm that produced the tornado also left about 175,000 hydro customers without power. There were no deaths in the community.

Climate data for Combermere
Month	Jan	Feb	Mar	Apr	May	Jun	Jul	Aug	Sep	Oct	Nov	Dec	Year
Record high °C (°F)	12.0 (53.6)	14.0 (57.2)	22.2 (72.0)	30.0 (86.0)	33.0 (91.4)	35.0 (95.0)	37.2 (99.0)	35.0 (95.0)	34.4 (93.9)	27.0 (80.6)	21.7 (71.1)	16.0 (60.8)	37.2 (99.0)
Mean daily maximum °C (°F)	−5.5 (22.1)	−2.9 (26.8)	2.4 (36.3)	10.4 (50.7)	17.9 (64.2)	23.0 (73.4)	25.5 (77.9)	24.0 (75.2)	19.2 (66.6)	11.8 (53.2)	4.6 (40.3)	−2.0 (28.4)	10.7 (51.3)
Daily mean °C (°F)	−11.6 (11.1)	−9.4 (15.1)	−3.8 (25.2)	4.4 (39.9)	11.5 (52.7)	16.8 (62.2)	19.4 (66.9)	18.1 (64.6)	13.4 (56.1)	6.7 (44.1)	0.4 (32.7)	−6.8 (19.8)	4.9 (40.8)
Mean daily minimum °C (°F)	−17.6 (0.3)	−15.9 (3.4)	−9.9 (14.2)	−1.6 (29.1)	5.0 (41.0)	10.5 (50.9)	13.3 (55.9)	12.1 (53.8)	7.6 (45.7)	1.6 (34.9)	−3.8 (25.2)	−11.5 (11.3)	−0.9 (30.4)
Record low °C (°F)	−40.0 (−40.0)	−37.8 (−36.0)	−32.0 (−25.6)	−23.9 (−11.0)	−10.0 (14.0)	−3.9 (25.0)	2.2 (36.0)	−0.6 (30.9)	−5.6 (21.9)	−10.6 (12.9)	−23.0 (−9.4)	−35.6 (−32.1)	−40.0 (−40.0)
Average precipitation mm (inches)	63.3 (2.49)	49.5 (1.95)	58.9 (2.32)	66.8 (2.63)	78.2 (3.08)	81.0 (3.19)	75.4 (2.97)	68.9 (2.71)	85.5 (3.37)	85.0 (3.35)	79.0 (3.11)	65.5 (2.58)	856.9 (33.74)
Average rainfall mm (inches)	17.4 (0.69)	12.9 (0.51)	27.5 (1.08)	55.2 (2.17)	78.0 (3.07)	81.0 (3.19)	75.4 (2.97)	68.9 (2.71)	85.5 (3.37)	80.9 (3.19)	57.1 (2.25)	19.8 (0.78)	659.5 (25.96)
Average snowfall cm (inches)	45.9 (18.1)	36.6 (14.4)	31.4 (12.4)	11.6 (4.6)	0.2 (0.1)	0.0 (0.0)	0.0 (0.0)	0.0 (0.0)	0.0 (0.0)	4.2 (1.7)	21.9 (8.6)	45.7 (18.0)	197.4 (77.7)
Source: Environment Canada

== Noted inhabitants ==
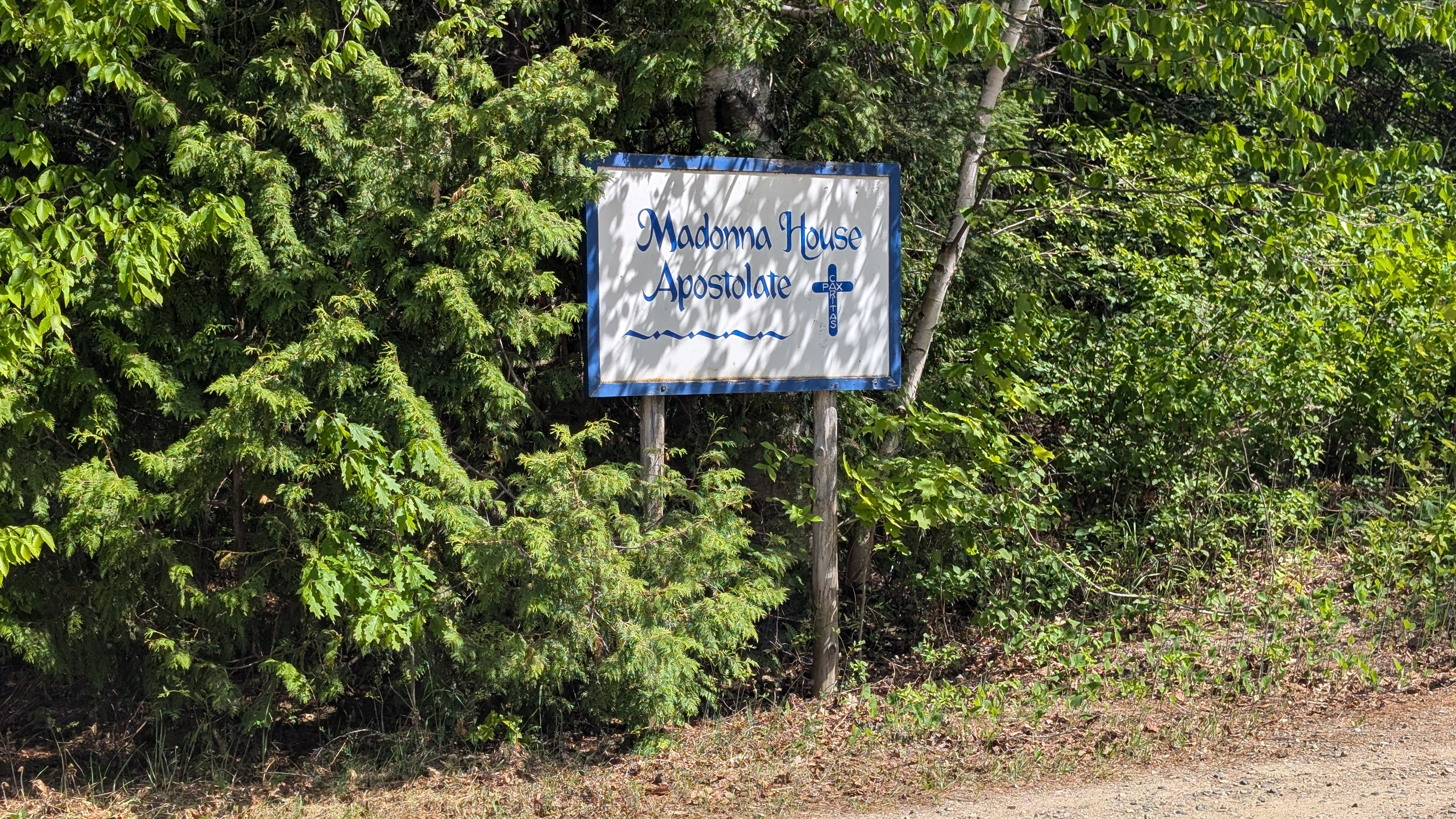
Entrance to Madonna House

- John Wesley Dafoe – Founder of the Winnipeg Free Press
- Baroness Catherine Doherty – Founder of Friendship House in Harlem and the Madonna House Apostolate, based in Combermere.
- Reverend Eddie Doherty – American newspaper reporter, co-founder of the Madonna House Apostolate.

== See also ==
- Combermere/Kamaniskeg Lake Water Aerodrome
- Our Lady of Combermere
