= Madonna House Apostolate =

Catholic Christian community

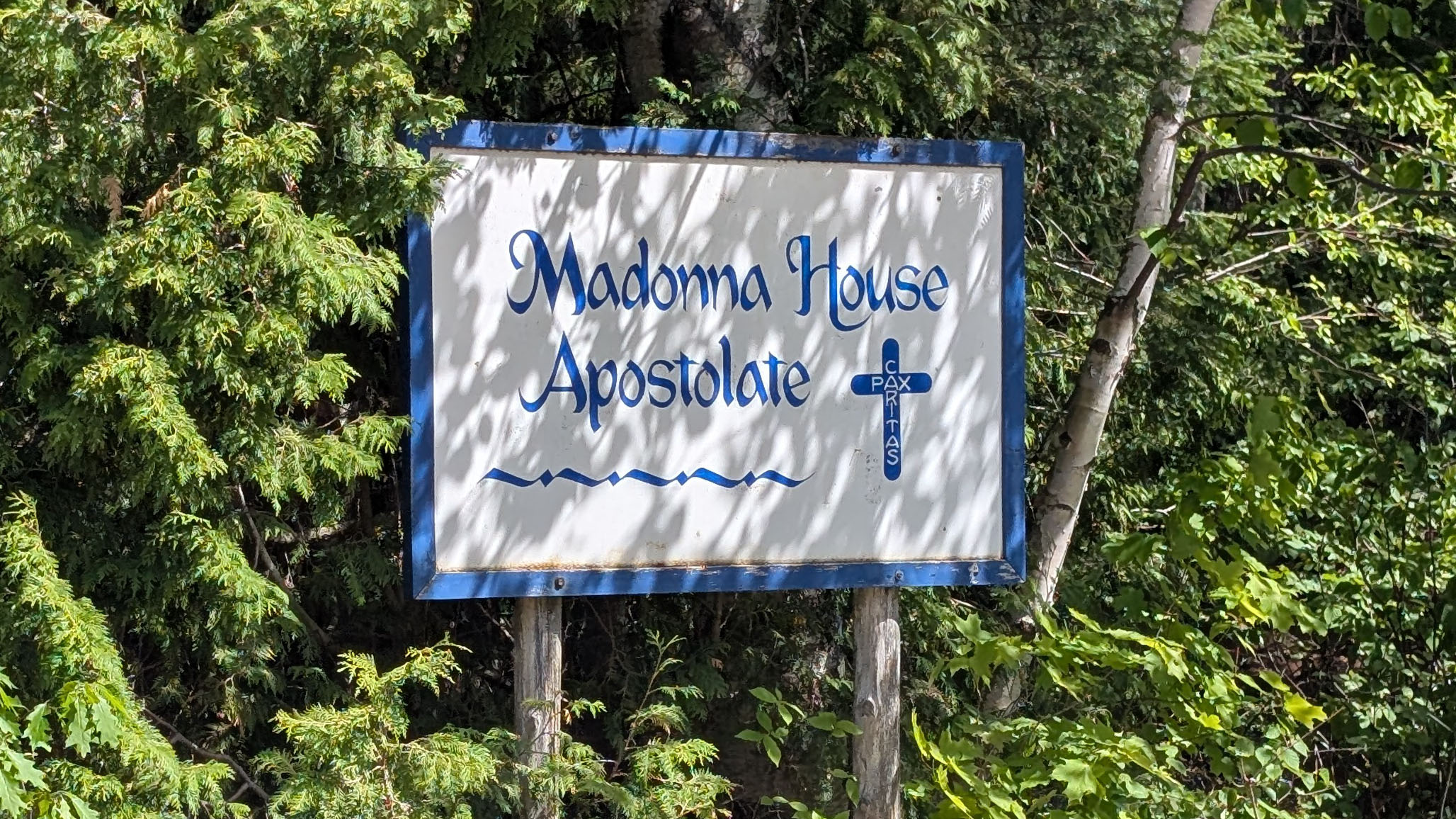
- Entrance to Madonna House (main house)
- Formation: 1947
- Founders: Catherine Doherty
- Members: (2023)
- Website: madonnahouse.org

The Madonna House Apostolate is a Catholic Christian community of laypeople and priests, all of whom take lifelong promises of poverty, chastity, and obedience and who are dedicated to loving and serving Jesus Christ in all areas of life. Madonna House was founded in 1947 by Catherine Doherty in Combermere, Ontario, and has established mission houses throughout the world. It is recognized by the Catholic Church as an association of the Christian faithful.

== History ==
Catherine de Hueck Doherty (1896–1985), foundress of the Madonna House Apostolate, was born in Russia to wealthy, deeply Christian parents. Baptized in the Russian Orthodox faith, she was taught that each person was Christ, and that one was especially called to serve him in the poor. Prayer was love, expressed through service in all areas of human life.

Having survived the maelstrom of World War I, the Russian Revolution and civil war, Catherine and her husband, Boris de Hueck, were admitted to England as refugees in 1919. While there, Catherine was received into the Catholic Church. In 1920 they immigrated to Toronto, Canada, where Catherine struggled to support her husband and infant son. She eventually regained a level of prosperity but was pursued by an inner call to give away her possessions and to go live with and serve the poor. This call, radical for its time, was blessed by the Bishop of Toronto, Rev. Neil MacNeil. To Catherine's surprise, other people, drawn by her gospel witness, begged to join her. This was the beginning of Friendship House in Toronto. They begged food and clothing for those in need, and Catherine countered Communist propaganda with the social teachings of the Catholic Church.

When misunderstandings and calumny forced the closure of Friendship House in 1936, Catherine moved to Harlem in New York to serve the Afro-Americans. She denounced the way practicing Catholics could deny Christ in their Black brothers. Once again a community formed around her, prospered, and spread to other cities.

Following the annulment of her marriage, Catherine wed the successful Irish-American newspaper reporter Eddie Doherty, and this union became a source of contention in Friendship House. Her broader vision of the apostolate was neither understood nor accepted by her coworkers. To avoid further division, and shattered by yet another rejection, Catherine and Eddie withdrew to the village of Combermere, in Ontario, intending to quietly live out their retirement. However, once again, people came to join her, and Bishop Smith of the Pembroke diocese invited her to open a rural apostolate in Combermere. Madonna House, as the new community was called, became the most fruitful and most lasting of her foundations.

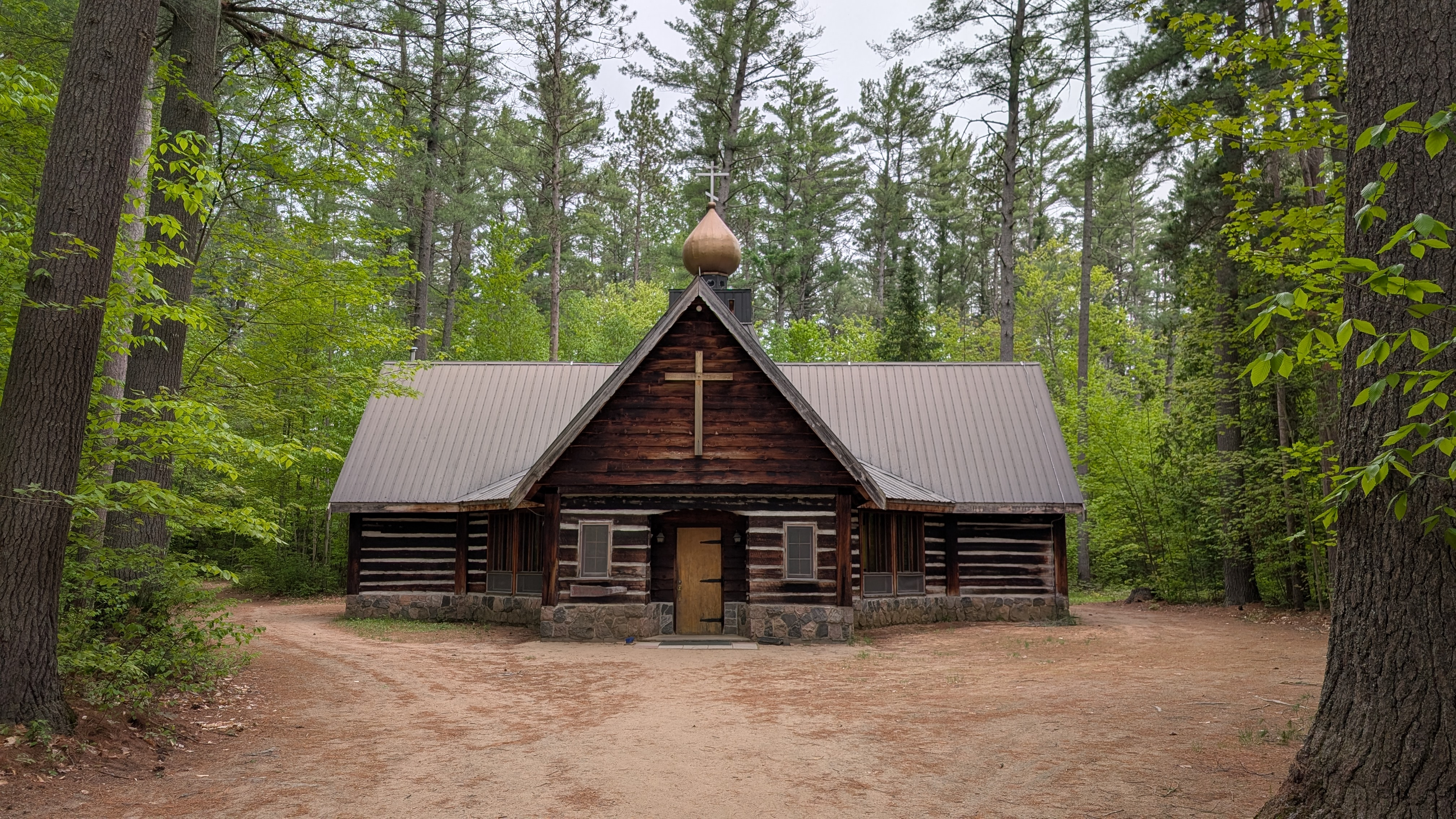
Outside the Island Chapel (AKA Our Lady of the Woods) at Madonna House that is biritural (both Roman & Eastern Catholic)

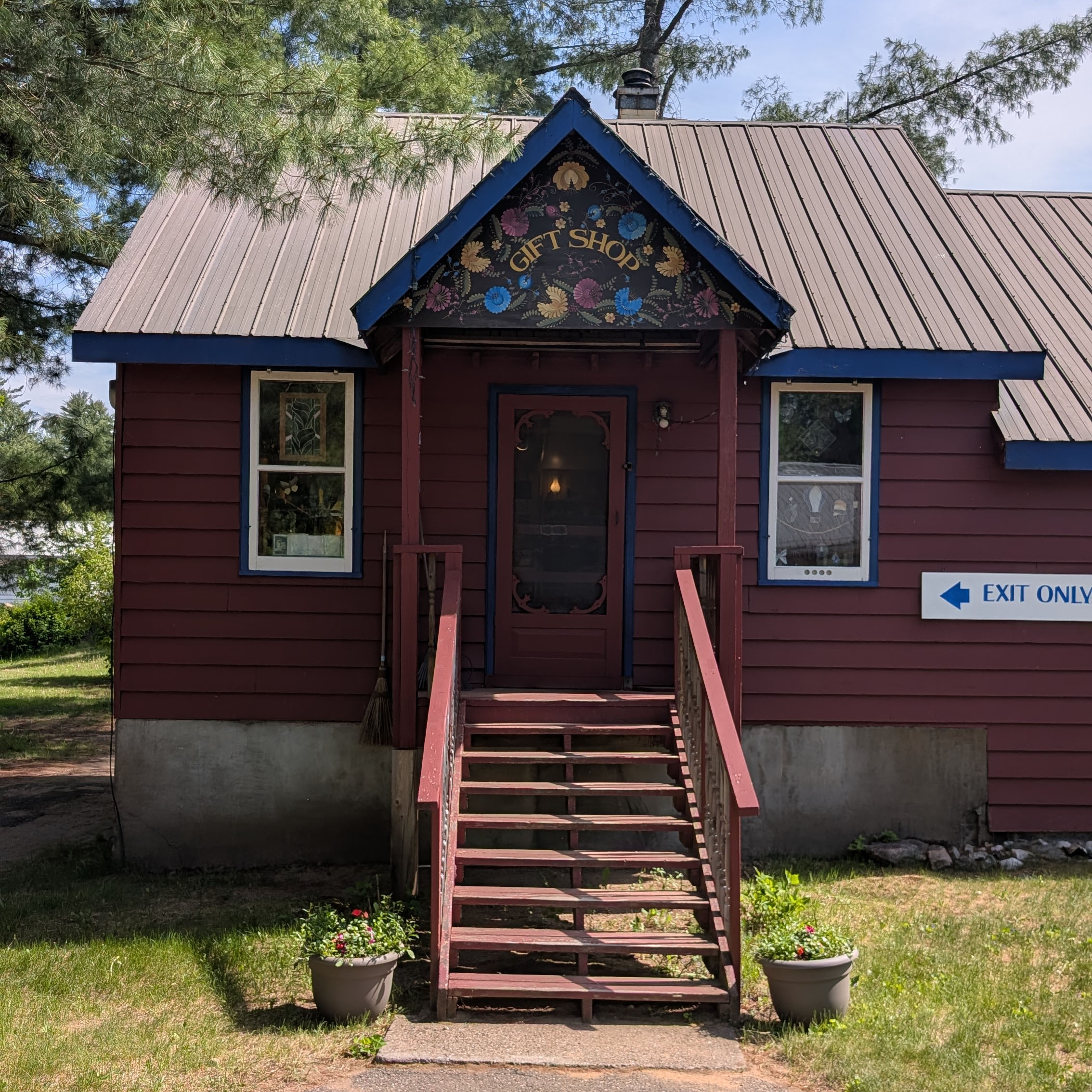
Madonna House gift shop

The young men and women who came, desiring to give their lives to God, were eventually joined by priests, who brought credibility and protection. At the 1952 Lay Congress in Rome, Cardinal Giovanni Montini (later Pope Paul VI) suggested to Catherine that Madonna House stabilize itself with vows of poverty, chastity, and obedience. The community voted to take lifelong promises, and in 1955 Catherine and Eddie also promised to lead a celibate life. Fourteen years later, Eddie would be ordained a priest in the Melkite rite of the Catholic Church.

On June 8, 1960, Bishop William Smith approved Madonna House as a Pious Union. The first mission house was opened in Whitehorse, Yukon, in 1954 at the invitation of Bishop Jean Louis Coudert, followed by missions in Edmonton, Alberta, Winslow, Arizona, and many others.

Since Catherine's death in 1985, the community has continued to grow and mature. In 2022, it included approximately 200 members and 16 mission houses in six countries.

== Way of life ==
The life of the Madonna House community is that of a Christian family striving to live the gospel in all the little things that make up everyday life, following the example of the Holy Family in Nazareth. Christ's command to "love one another as I have loved you" is expressed in service to those one lives with and each person one meets. Love is the very heart of the Gospel, and the call to love is considered the root of all apostolic outreach.

=== Hospitality ===
Live-in guests are an important part of the life in Combermere. They are integrated into the family and share the rhythm of prayer and work. The latter comprises all that is necessary for the maintenance of the community. According to the foundress, welcoming another into one's heart is as important as welcoming them into one's home.

=== Prayer ===
Madonna House life is permeated by prayer expressed in work and in service to others, as well as in liturgical prayer. Members and guests gather for daily Mass and either lauds or vespers. The rosary is prayed after the evening meal. The call to "preach the Gospel with one's life", however, transforms every activity, from work, to meals, to sports and other forms of recreation into an expression of love for God and neighbor.

=== Voluntary poverty ===
The community receives no government support and lives entirely on donations. They wear second hand clothing and much of the food is raised on their farm. The call to poverty, however, is rooted in Doherty's belief in the need for Madonna House members to depend completely on God, both materially and interiorly.

=== Duty of the moment ===
The phrase "duty of the moment" expresses the guiding conviction that the will of God is made known in whatever needs to be done at a given time. "In essence, ordinary, simple work done for the benefit of God and neighbour gives everyone at Madonna House meaning, no matter who you are. Put another way, ordinary work around Madonna House is more than just ordinary work. It's shot through with love, faith, hope and charity — those things that have always given dignity to humankind."

=== Sobornost ===
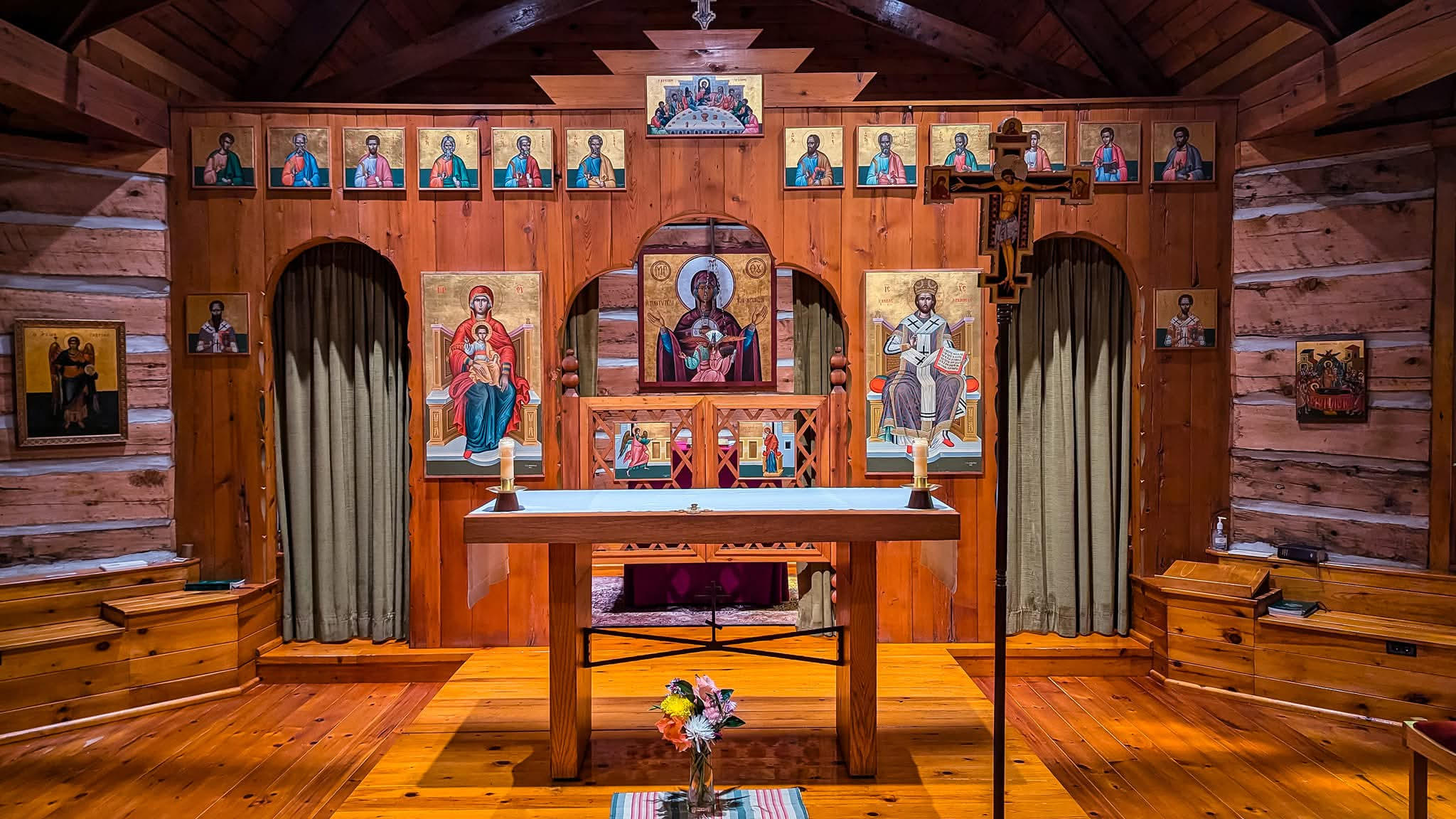
Inside the Island Chapel

Sobornost is a Russian word referring to a unity of heart, mind, and soul that develops in a group when each person is listening to and is surrendered to the Holy Spirit. Doherty considered sobornost a fundamental principle of Christian community and saw in it an answer to the rampant individualism of contemporary society.

The call to sobornost is reflected in the very structure of the community. Priests, laymen, and laywomen live and move as members of one family. Each of the three branches is governed by a Director General who must be elected unanimously ("in sobornost") by that branch, and the three Directors General are also called to move in deep unity.

=== Poustinia ===
The Russian word for 'wasteland', poustinia, in its Madonna House form, and as described in her classic work Poustinia: Encountering God in Silence, Solitude and Prayer, refers to a small, sparsely furnished cabin or room where one typically spends twenty-four hours in prayer and fasting, reading Scripture and listening for God's word in one's heart. In Combermere some 20 cabins are available to members and guests for this purpose.

== Outreach ==
An "apostolic farm," St. Benedict's Acres, provides much of the food for the community and teaches members and guests working there to learn to know God in a deeper way as they care for the land for which they are the stewards.

A monthly non-profit newspaper called Restoration is published 10 times a year.

Madonna House Publications, a non-profit organization, makes available books by Doherty and other community members, cards with artwork by community artists, a website and online newsletter "Pass It On."

A Cana Colony summer camp welcomes families each year for a week of Christian living, prayer, and reflection.

== Mission houses ==
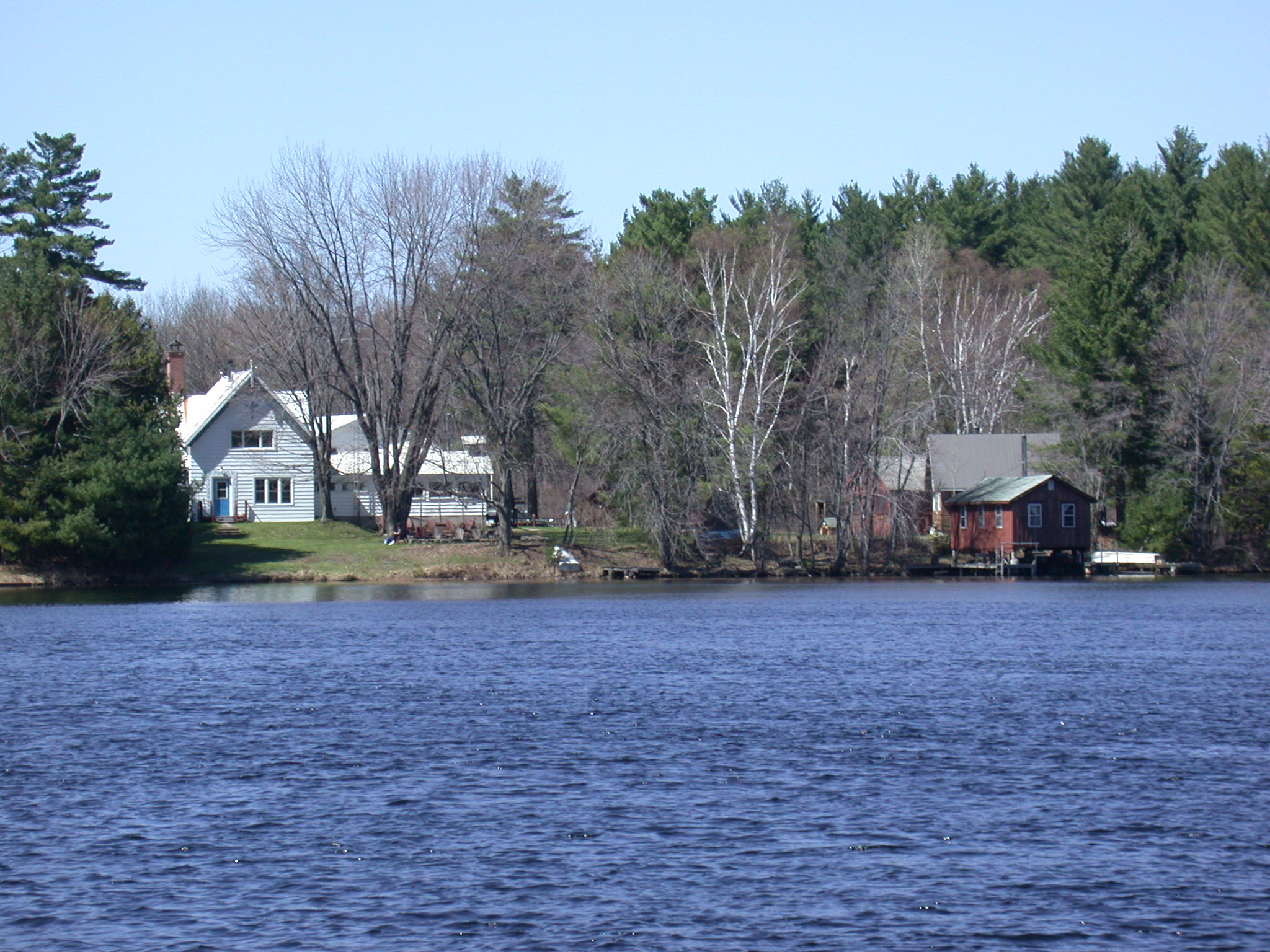
A view of the main house in Combermere from across the Madawaska River.

In addition to the training centre in Combermere, Ontario, the Madonna House Apostolate includes mission houses established at the invitation of the local bishop.

In Canada, these houses are presently found in Combermere (St Joseph's Rural Apostolate), Ottawa, Toronto, and Windsor, Ontario; Regina, Saskatchewan; Edmonton, Alberta; Vancouver, British Columbia; and Whitehorse, Yukon.

In the U.S. there are mission houses in Washington, DC; Roanoke, Virginia; Salem Missouri; Alpena, Michigan, and Winslow, Arizona.

International houses are currently located in Carriacou, Grenada, West Indies; Robin Hood's Bay, England; Resteigne, Belgium; and Krasnoyarsk, Russia.

The service of each foundation varies according to the needs of the local Church, as agreed upon with the bishop of the given diocese. Houses in Edmonton and Regina serve the homeless through food, clothing and friendship. Many missions are described as "prayer/listening" houses, where people are welcomed for the poustinia or to unburden themselves to a listening heart.

== Our Lady of Combermere ==
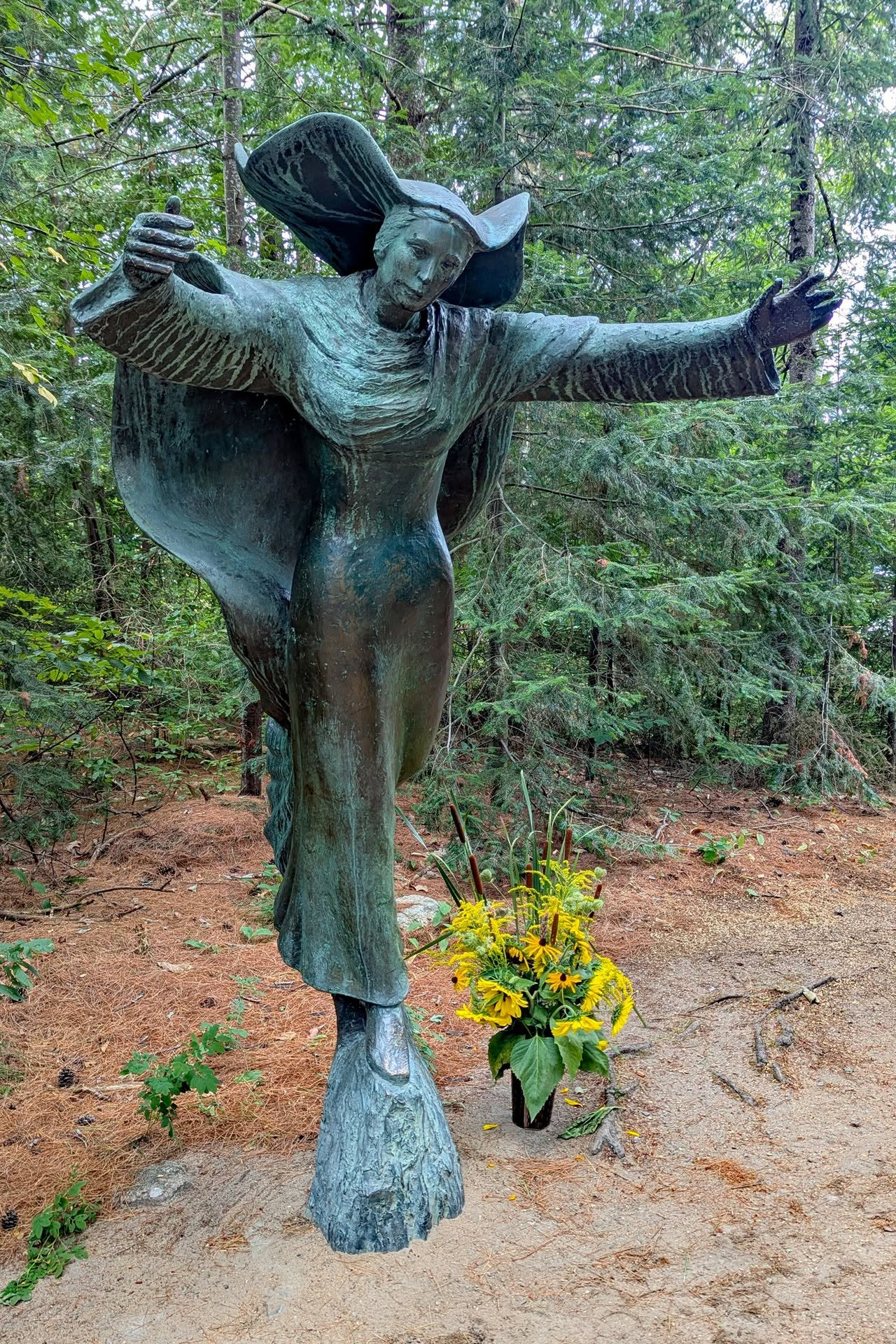
Our Lady of Combermere statue at Madonna House

The bronze statue of Our Lady of Combermere stands on the grounds of Madonna House in Combermere. Sculpted by the artist Frances Rich, it was officially installed and blessed by the Most Rev. William J. Smith, Bishop of Pembroke, on June 8, 1960.

== See also ==
- Catherine Doherty, foundress of Madonna House
- Eddie Doherty
- Poustinia
- Friendship House
- Joseph Raya
- Catholic Worker Movement - A similar Catholic organisation offering accommodation
