= Eunice Tietjens =

American poet

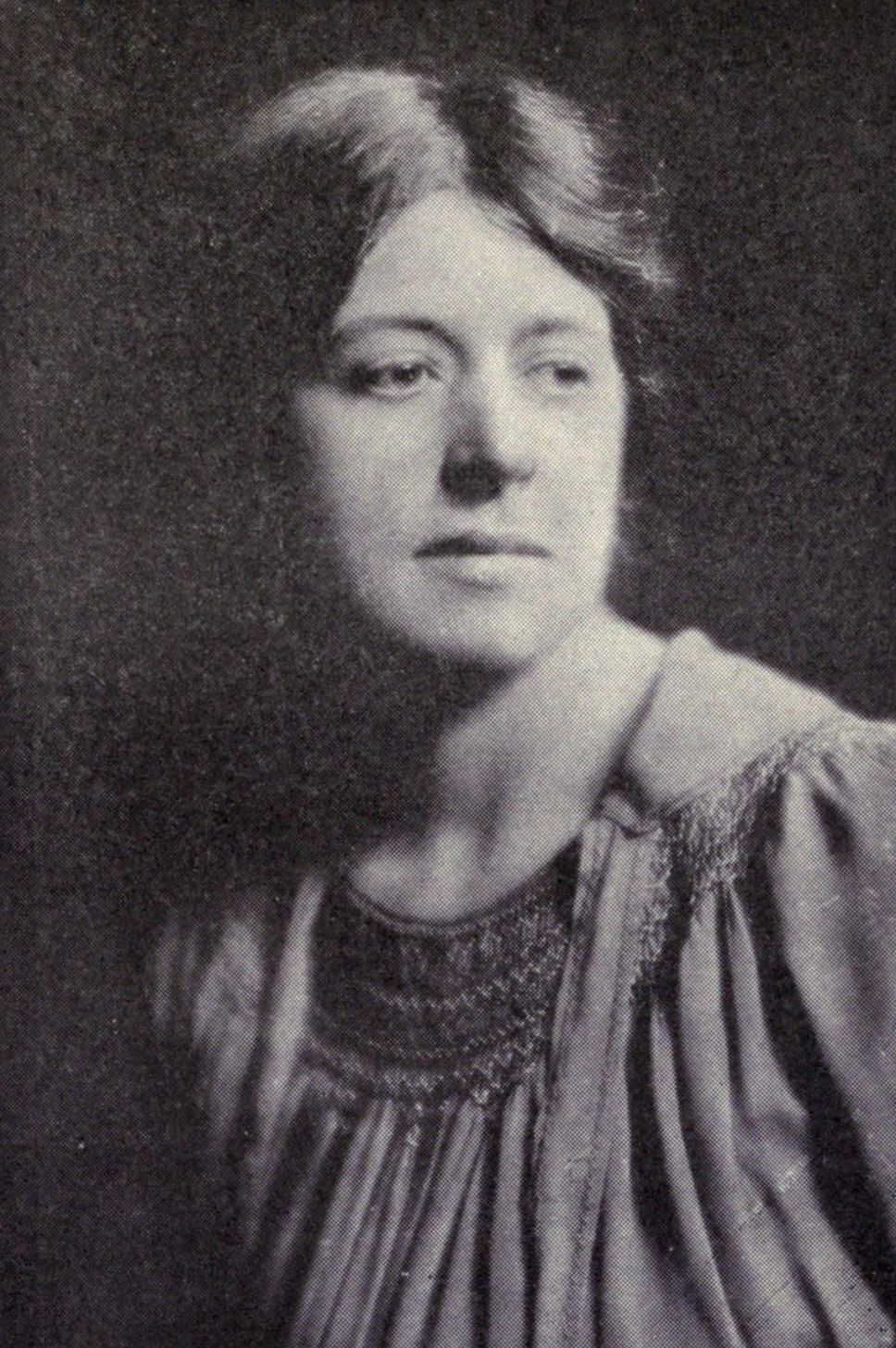
Portrait of Eunice Tietjens

Eunice Tietjens (July 29, 1884 – September 6, 1944) was an American poet, novelist, journalist, children's author, lecturer, and editor.

== Early years and education ==
Eunice Strong Hammond was born in Chicago, Illinois, on July 29, 1884. She was educated in Europe and traveled extensively. She lived in Florida, New York City, Japan, China, Tahiti and Tunisia, among other places.

== Career ==
After her divorce in 1914, Tietjens was a World War I correspondent for the Chicago Daily News in France, in 1917 and 1918. Her poems had already begun to be published in Poetry: A Magazine of Verse, the noted poetry magazine, around 1913. She later became publisher Harriet Monroe's associate editor there for more than twenty-five years. Tietjens was considered a more patient and generous editor, whose style contrasted sharply with that of Monroe, who was not known to treat would-be contributors with "kid gloves".

One collection of stories, Burton Holmes Travel Stories: Japan, Korea and Formosa (1924) contains lively descriptions of East Asian countries. By contemporary standards, the stories seem provincial and quaintly Eurocentric. The stories contain descriptions of nationalities and ethnicities that can be understood to be racist. Here's an excerpt:

For a great many years this island of Formosa was a terror that haunted all the Western sailors who sailed in those seas. The sea around it is the birthplace of terrible tropical typhoons, which spring up suddenly and sweep helpless ships onto the sharp cliffs, where they are dashed to pieces. And, before Japan tamed her tiger, if a few poor half-drowned sailors managed to land, they were usually captured by the savages who lived there and killed by them. Their heads were preserved as trophies and their bodies eaten, for these savages were cannibals.

Tietjens was also a contributing editor for the Compton's Encyclopedia.

== Personal life ==
Her first husband was Paul Tietjens, whom she married in Paris in 1904 and by whom she had two daughters, Idea and Janet. They divorced in 1914 in the aftermath of Idea's death, and she remarried in 1920 to Cloyd Head, playwright and theatrical director, by whom she had a son, Marshall Head.

She died in 1944 in her hometown of Chicago, aged 60, from cancer. Her papers may be found at the Newberry Library, Roger and Julie Baskes Department of Special Collections.

Newberry Library at 60 West Walton Street, Chicago, Illinois

== Poems ==
- Old Friendship
- The Steam Shovel
- Presence of Eternity
- The Great Man
- The Most Sacred Mountain
- The Drug Clerk
- The Bacchante to Her Babe
