= Bernard James Sheil =

American Catholic bishop (1888–1969)

The Most Reverend Bernard James Sheil
- Auxiliary Bishop of Chicago
- See: Chicago
- Installed: May 1, 1928
- Term ended: September 13, 1969

Orders
- Ordination: May 21, 1910
- Consecration: May 1, 1928

Personal details
- Born: February 18, 1888 Chicago, Illinois
- Died: September 13, 1969 (aged 81) Tucson, Arizona
- Denomination: Roman Catholic Church

Bernard James Sheil (February 18, 1888 – September 13, 1969) was an Auxiliary Roman Catholic Bishop of Chicago.

== Biography ==
Born and raised in Chicago, Sheil was ordained a priest on May 3, 1910. He was named auxiliary Bishop of Chicago in 1928, a post he held for over forty years. As bishop he was given the titular see of Pegae. On June 5, 1959, he was raised to the rank of Archbishop, being named titular Archbishop of Selge.

Sheil was "outspoken advocate of social justice in the underprivileged and marginalized sectors of the community." His pro-labor stance led him to endorse some controversial strikes.

Bishop Sheil was founder of Catholic Youth Organization (CYO). According to a history of Catholic Scouting, while Cardinal Mundelein of Chicago had "explored the possibility of Scouting for his 'street kiddies,' it was not until his newly consecrated auxiliary, Bishop Bernard J. Sheil, took the reins, that Catholic Scouting flourished in Chicago." He was awarded the Silver Buffalo Award by the Boy Scouts of America in 1942.

The Sheil School of Social Studies, which focused on adult education, opened at CYO headquarters in 1943. In eleven years of operation, it enrolled 20,000 students. In 1954, Sheil vehemently attacked Joseph McCarthy, at a time when most Catholics supported this right-wing senator, provoking the withdrawal of some of the financial supporters of his projects. The Sheil Catholic Center at Northwestern University is also named for him.

== See also ==
- Roman Catholic Church
- Roman Catholic Archdiocese of Chicago
