= List of schools in the Archdiocese of Washington =

Archdiocese of Washington (Archdiocese of Washington Catholic Schools) Archidioecesis Vashingtonensis

Location
- Country: United States
- Territory: District of Columbia, plus the counties of Montgomery, Prince George's, St. Mary's, Calvert, and Charles in Maryland

This article lists Roman Catholic schools, colleges and universities in the Roman Catholic Archdiocese of Washington -- also known as the Archdiocese of Washington Catholic Schools

== Colleges and universities ==
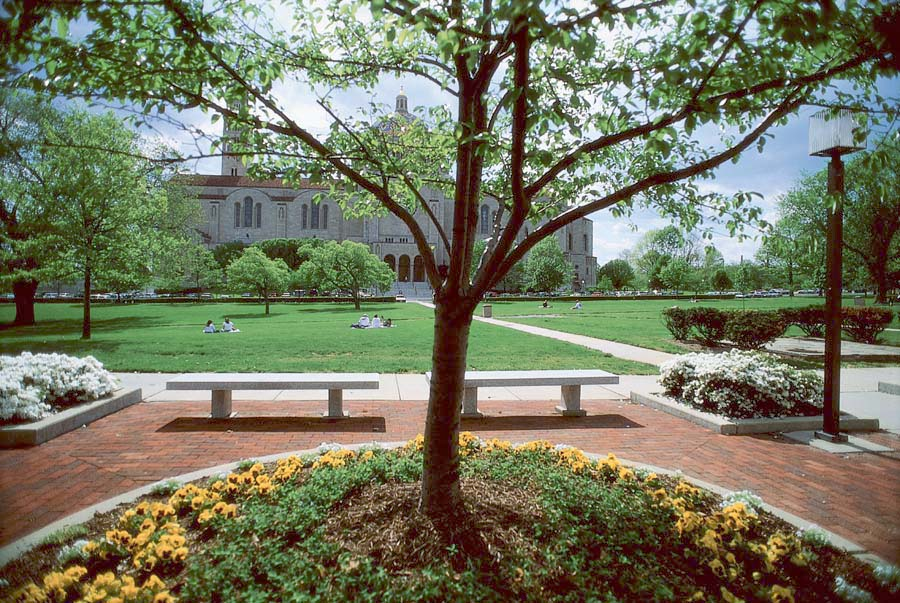
The Catholic University of America

Seal	School	Location	Religious order	Founded
	The Catholic University of America	Washington, D.C.	–	1887
	Dominican House of Studies	Washington, D.C.	Dominican Order	1905
	Georgetown University	Washington, D.C.	Society of Jesus	1789
	Trinity Washington University	Washington, D.C.	Sisters of Notre Dame de Namur	1897

== Secondary schools ==
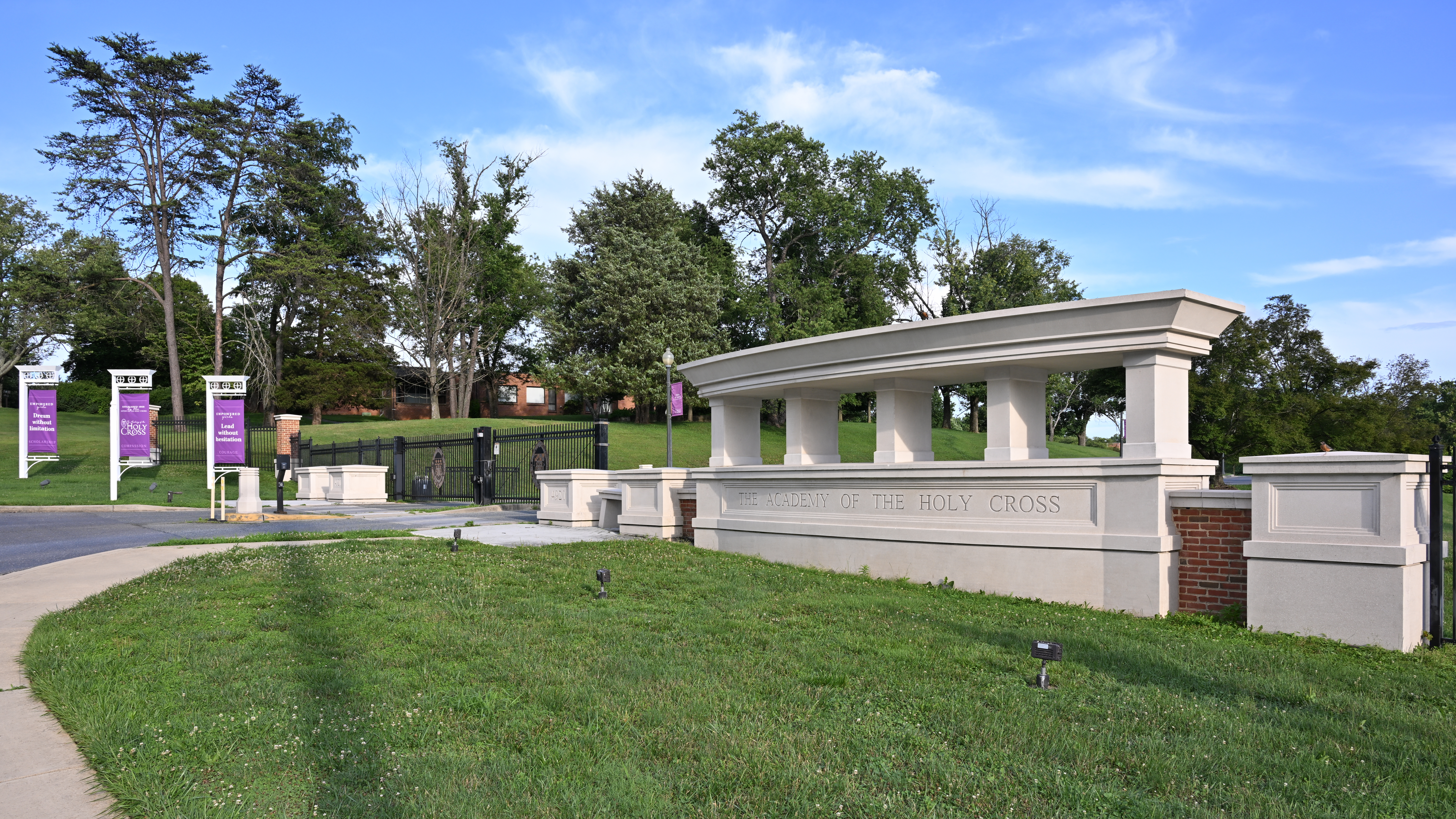
Academy of the Holy Cross

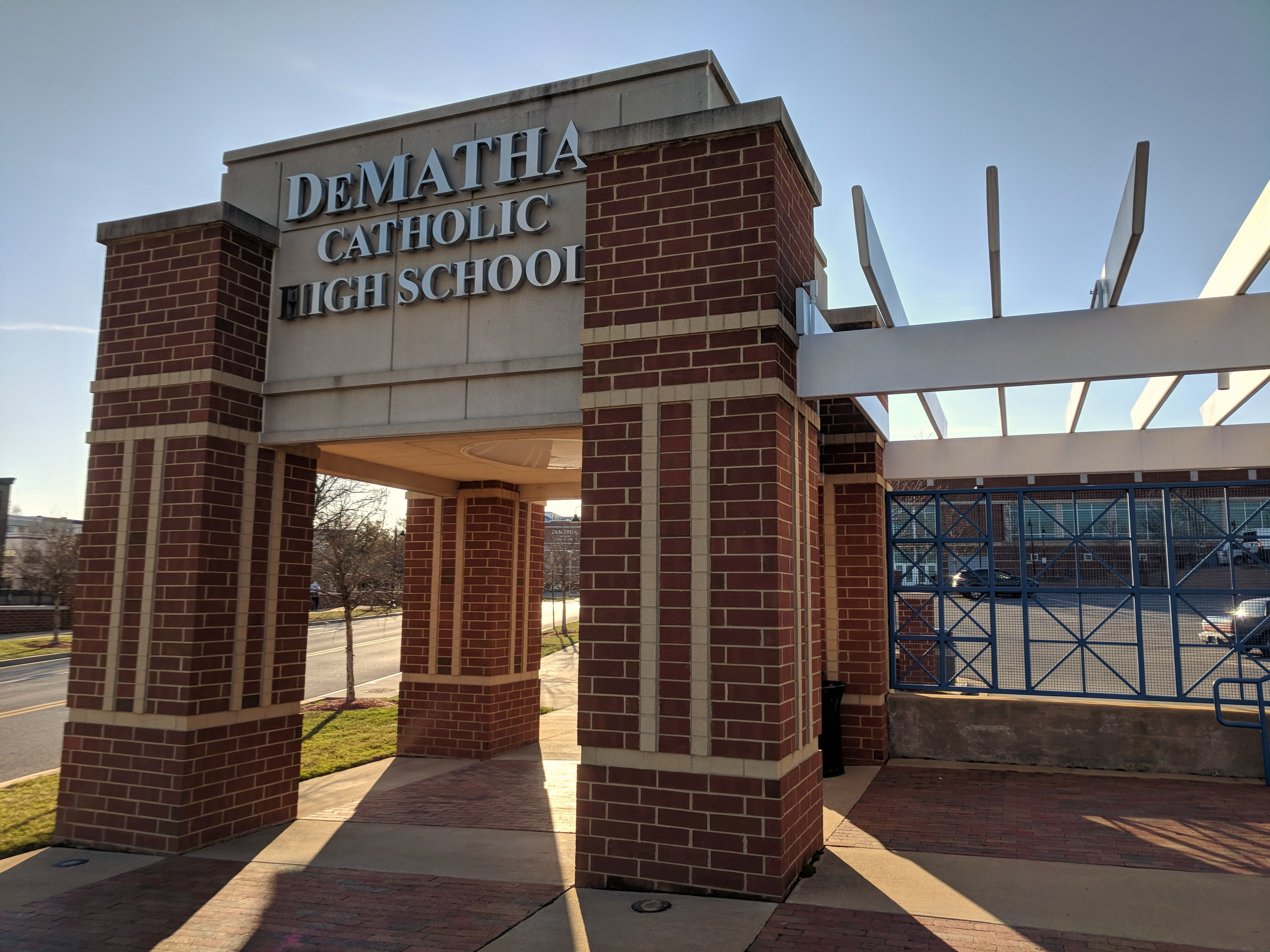
DeMatha Catholic High School

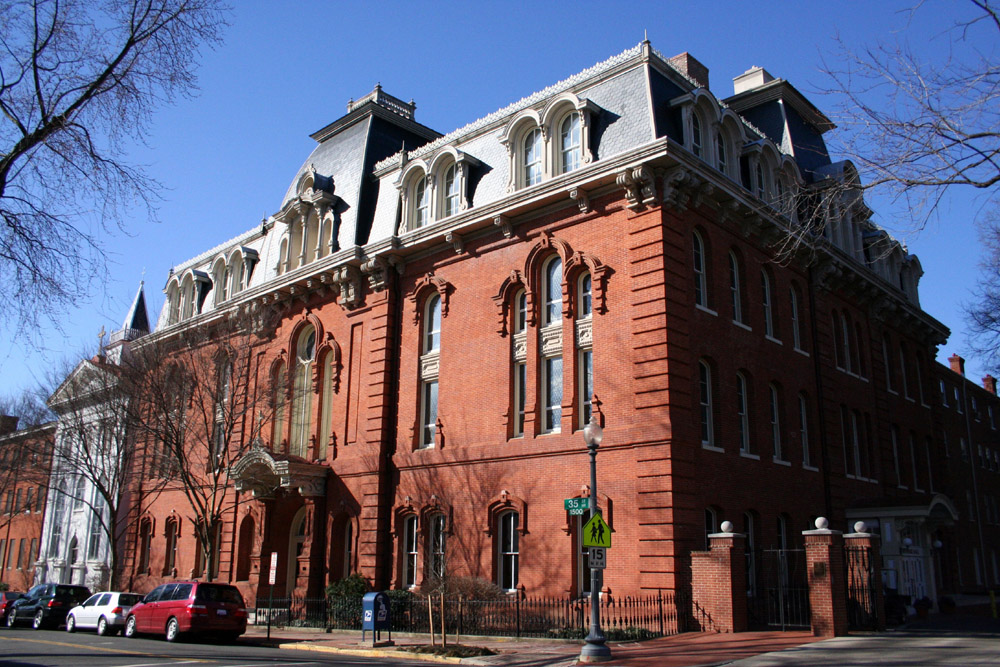
Georgetown Visitation Preparatory School

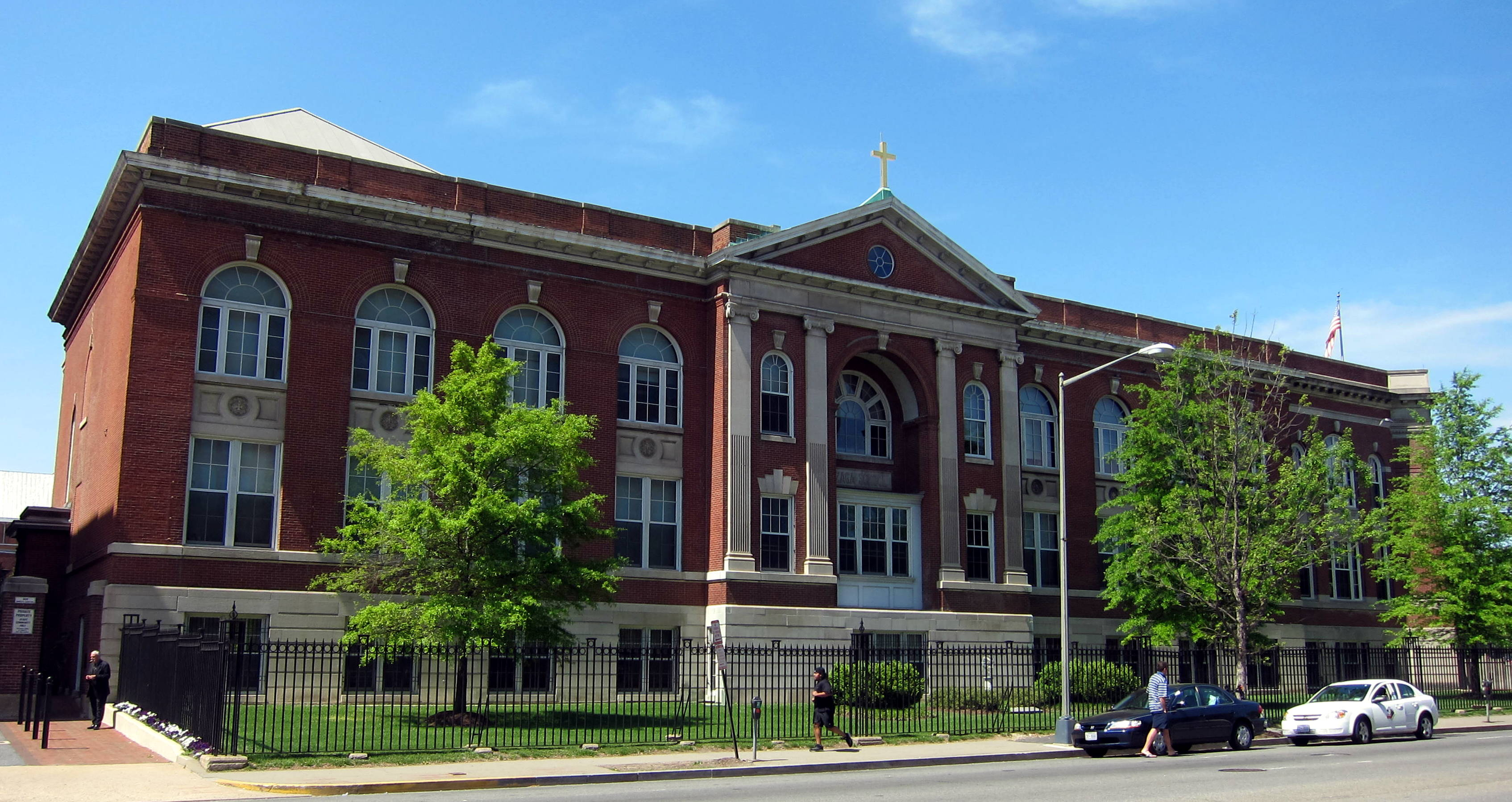
Gonzaga College High School

School	Location	Religious order	Founded
Academy of the Holy Cross	Kensington	Sisters of the Holy Cross	1868
Archbishop Carroll High School	Washington, D.C.	Order of St. Augustine (former)	1951
The Avalon School	Wheaton	–	2003
Bishop McNamara High School	Forestville	Congregation of Holy Cross	1964
Brookewood School	Kensington	–	2006
Connelly School of the Holy Child	Potomac	Society of the Holy Child Jesus	1961
DeMatha Catholic High School	Hyattsville	Trinitarian Order	1946
Don Bosco Cristo Rey High School	Takoma Park	Salesians of Don Bosco	2007
Elizabeth Seton High School	Bladensburg	Daughters of Charity of St. Vincent de Paul	1957
Georgetown Preparatory School	North Bethesda	Society of Jesus	1789
Georgetown Visitation Preparatory School	Washington, D.C.	Order of the Visitation of Holy Mary	1799
Gonzaga College High School	Washington, D.C.	Society of Jesus	1821
The Heights School	Potomac	–	1969
Our Lady of Good Counsel High School	Olney	Xaverian Brothers	1958
St. Anselm's Abbey School	Washington, D.C.	Order of St. Benedict	1942
St. John's College High School	Washington, D.C.	De La Salle Christian Brothers	1851
St. Mary's Ryken High School	Leonardtown	Xaverian Brothers	1981
St. Vincent Pallotti High School	Laurel	Pallottines	1921
Stone Ridge School of the Sacred Heart	Bethesda	Society of the Sacred Heart	1923

== Grade schools ==
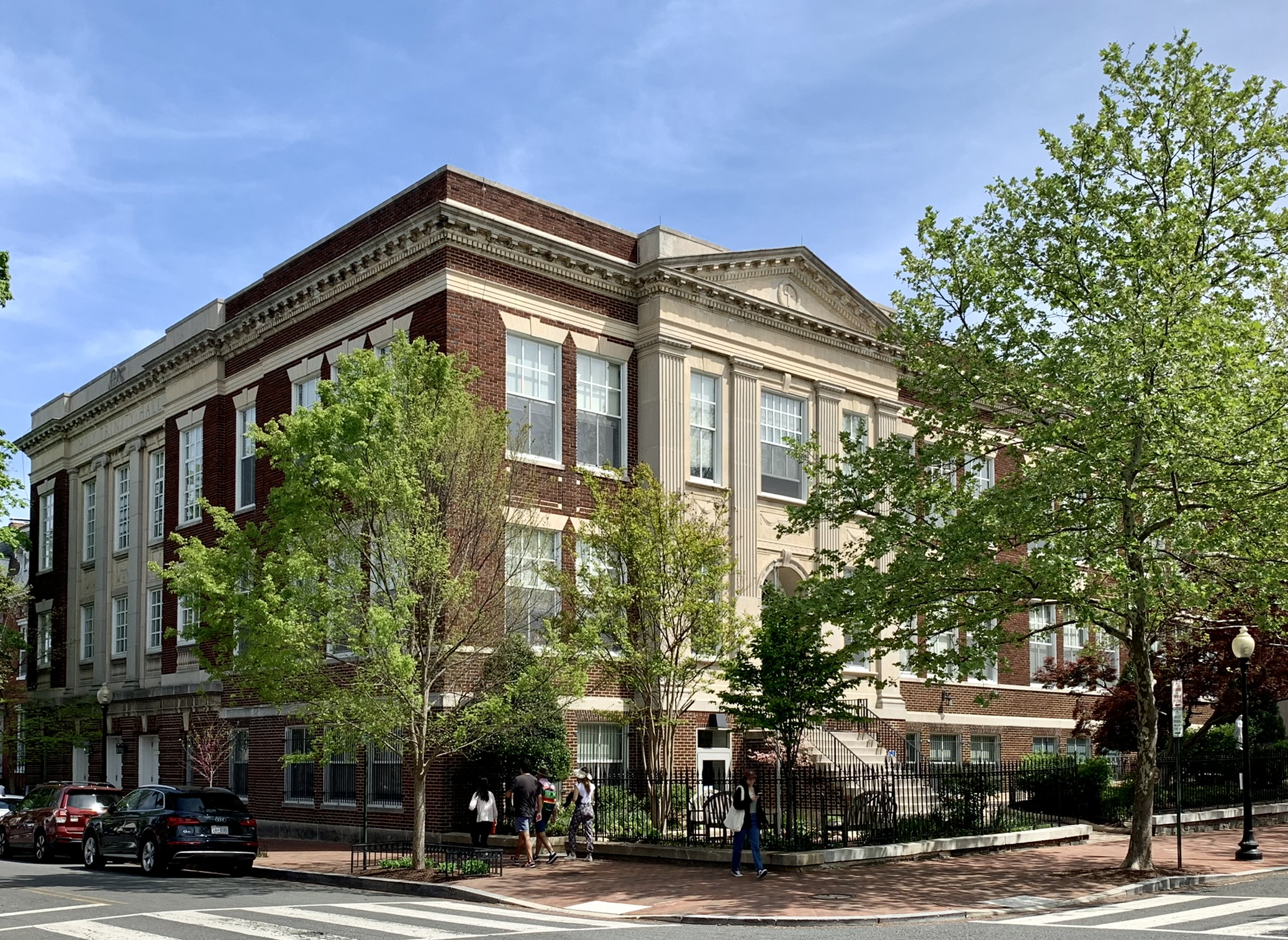
Holy Trinity School in Washington

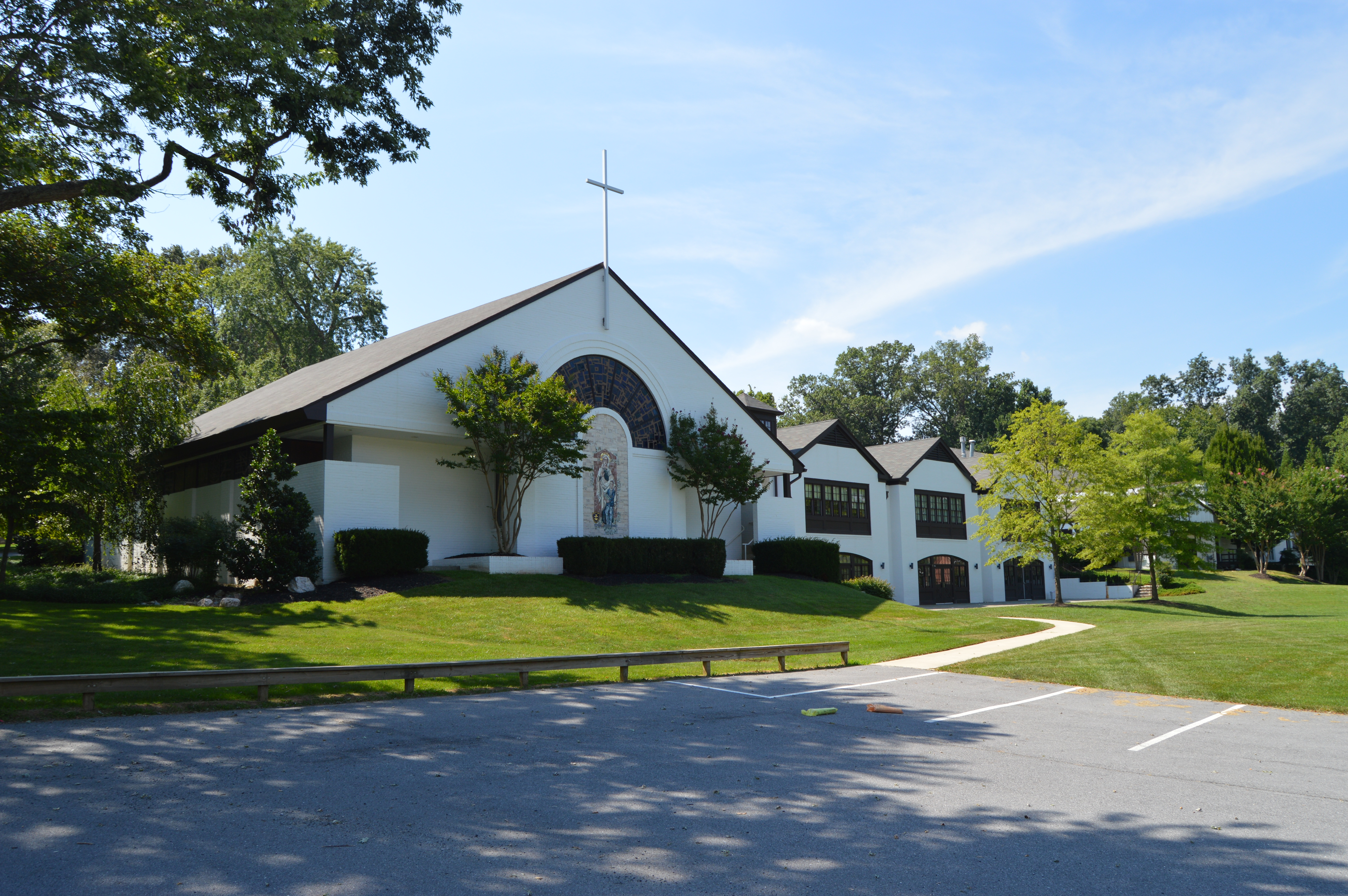
Mater Dei School in Bethesda

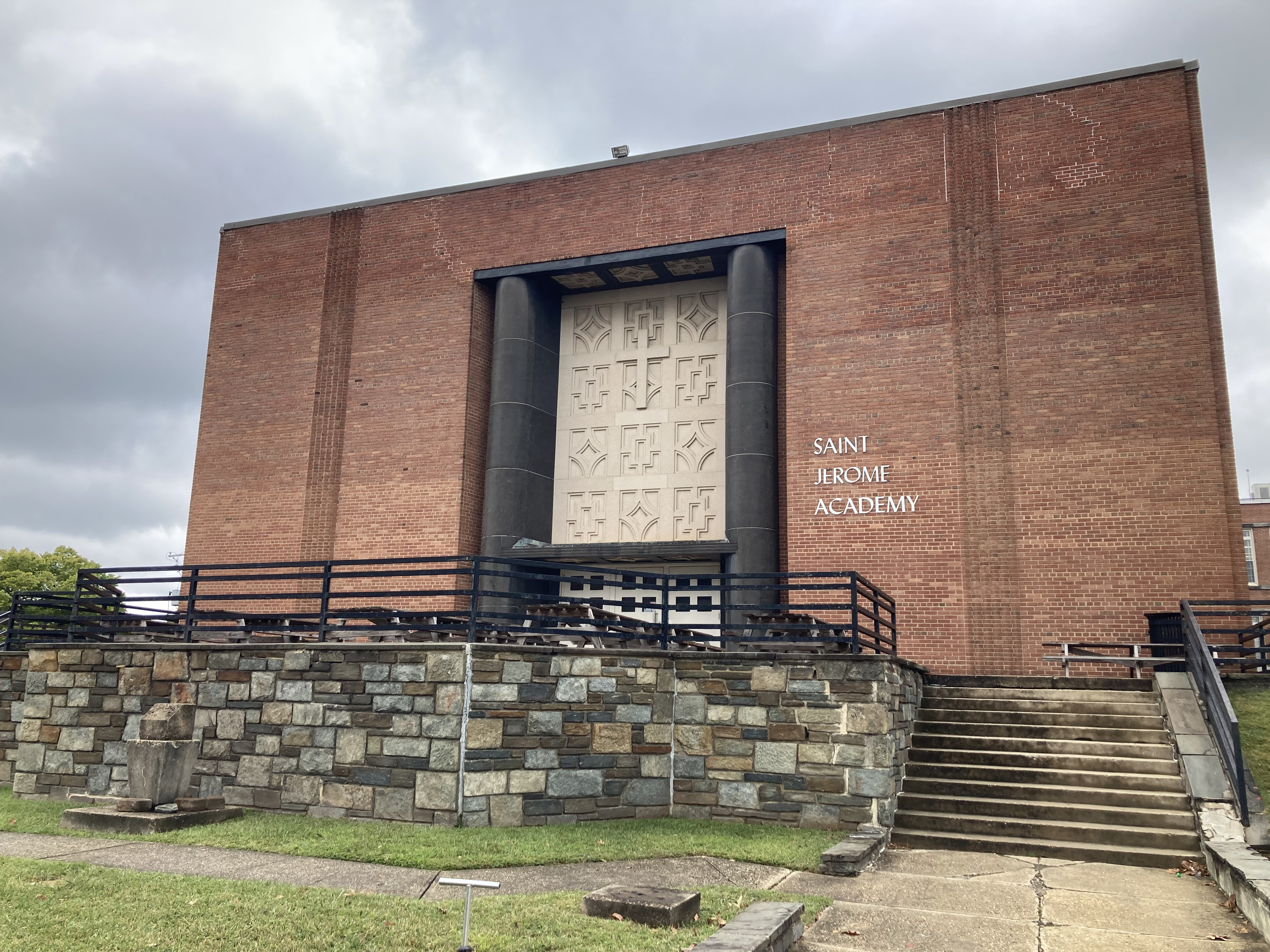
Saint Jerome Academy in Hyattsville

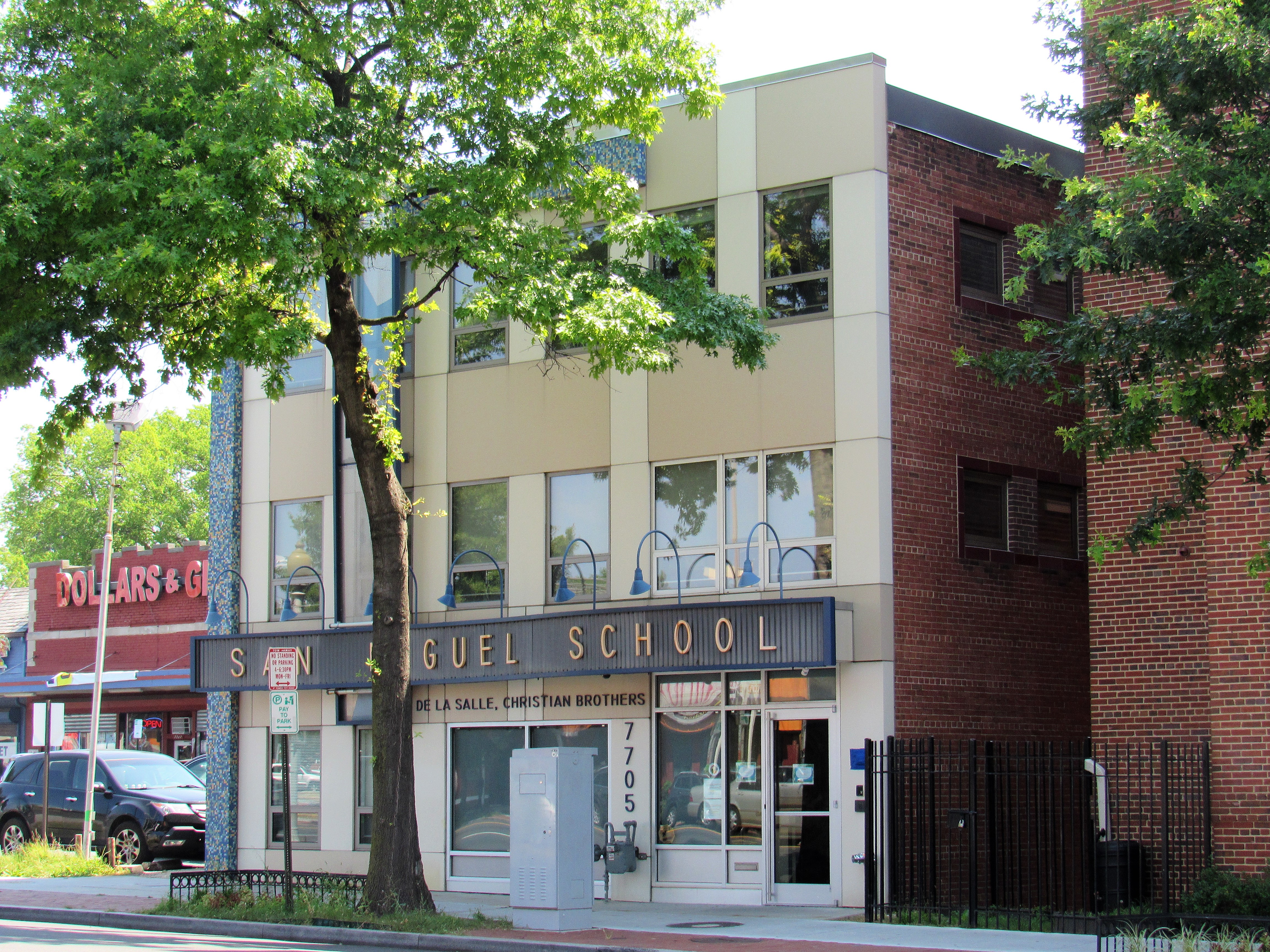
San Miguel School in Washington

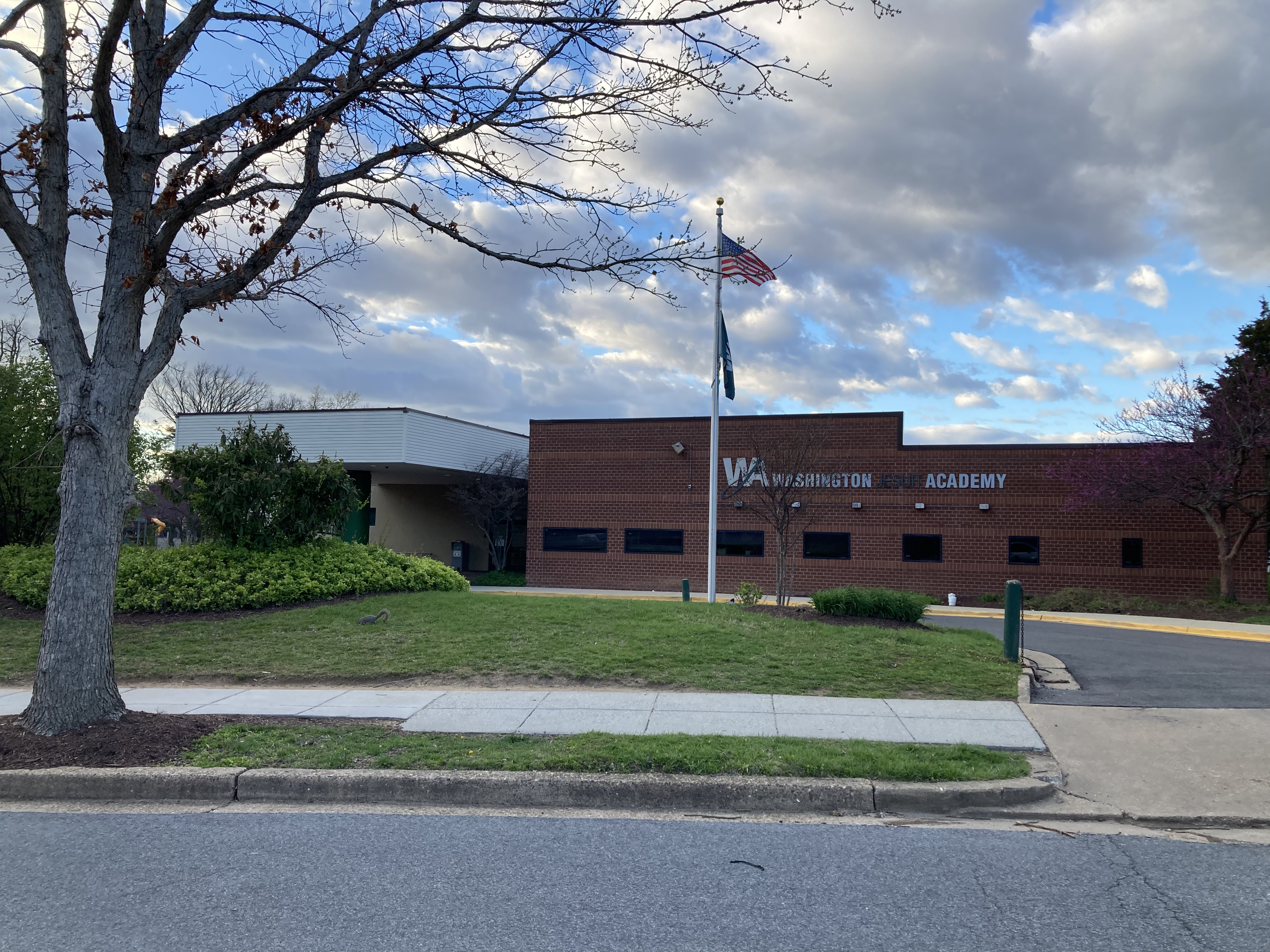
Washington Jesuit Academy

School	Location	Religious order	Founded	Ref		
Academy of St. Matthias the Apostle	Lanham	–	1962			
Annunciation Catholic School	Washington, D.C.	Society of the Holy Child Jesus (former)	1954			
Archbishop Neale School	La Plata	Sisters, Servants of the Immaculate Heart of Mary	1927			
Blessed Sacrament School	Washington, D.C.	Sisters of the Holy Cross (former)	1923			
Cardinal Hickey Academy	Owings	–	1997			
Christian Beginnings Preschool of St. John Vianney	Prince Frederick	–	–			
Father Andrew White, S.J. School	Leonardtown	–	1954			
Good News Preschool	Huntingtown	–	–			
Holy Cross School	Garrett Park	–	1961			
Holy Family School	Hillcrest Heights	–	–			
Holy Redeemer School	College Park	Sisters of Providence of St. Mary-of-the-Woods (former)	1931			
Holy Redeemer School	Kensington	Sisters of Charity of Cincinnati	1951			
Holy Trinity School	Washington, D.C.	Society of Jesus Sisters of Mercy (former) Sisters of Providence of St. Mary-of-the-Woods (former) Sisters of St. Joseph of Chestnut Hill (former)	1818			
Lieutenant Joseph P. Kennedy Institute	Washington, D.C.	–	–			
Little Flower School	Bethesda	Sisters, Servants of the Immaculate Heart of Mary	1953			
Little Flower School	Great Mills	–	–			
Mary of Nazareth School	Darnestown	Religious Teachers Filippini (former) Sisters of St. Francis of the Martyr St. George (former)	1994			
Mater Dei School	Bethesda	–	–			
Mother Catherine Spalding Academy	Mechanicsville	–	–			
Mother of God School	Gaithersburg	–	–			
Our Lady of Good Counsel School	Olney	–	–			
Our Lady of Lourdes School	Bethesda	Sisters of St. Francis	1941			
Our Lady of Mercy School	Potomac	–	–			
Our Lady of Victory School	Washington, D.C.	Sisters of Notre Dame de Namur (former)	1955			
Our Lady Star of the Sea School	Solomons	–	1933			
Our Lady's Little Christians Preschool	Waldorf	–	–			
Resurrection Catholic Preschool	Burtonsville	–	–			
Sacred Heart School	Washington, D.C.	Sinsinawa Dominican Sisters (former)	1931			
San Miguel School	Washington, D.C.	De La Salle Christian Brothers	2002			
St. Ambrose School	Cheverly	–	1950			
St. Andrew Apostle School	Silver Spring	Congregation of Our Lady of Lourdes	1960			
St. Ann's Preschool	Washington, D.C.	Daughters of Charity of St. Vincent de Paul	1949			
St. Anthony of Padua Catholic School	Washington, D.C.	Benedictine Sisters (former)	1927			
St. Augustine Catholic School	Washington, D.C.	Oblate Sisters of Providence (former) Handmaids of the Holy Child Jesus	1858			
St. Bartholomew School	Bethesda	Congregation of Divine Providence (former)	1962			
St. Bernadette School	Silver Spring	Sisters of St. Francis (former)	1947			
St. Columba School	Oxon Hill	–	1962			
St. Elizabeth Catholic School	Rockville	–	1966			
St. Francis International School	Silver Spring	–	2010			
St. Francis Xavier Catholic Academy	Washington, D.C.	School Sisters of Notre Dame (former)	1939			
St. Jane de Chantal School	Bethesda	Order of the Visitation of Holy Mary (former)	1950			
St. Jerome Academy	Hyattsville	Sisters of Notre Dame de Namur (former)	1943			
St. Jerome Child Center	Hyattsville	–	1985			
St. John's School	Hollywood	Sisters of Charity of Nazareth (former)	1923			
St. John the Baptist Catholic Elementary School	Silver Spring	Servants of the Holy Heart of Mary (former)	1962			
St. John the Evangelist Catholic Elementary School	Clinton	Sisters, Servants of the Immaculate Heart of Mary (former)	1961			
St. John the Evangelist School	Silver Spring	Sisters, Servants of the Immaculate Heart of Mary	1950			
St. Joseph's Regional Catholic School	Beltsville	–	1965			
St. Jude Regional Catholic School	Rockville	–	1956			
St. Martin of Tours School	Gaithersburg	–	1925			
St. Mary's School	Bryantown	Sisters of Notre Dame de Namur (former)	1915			
St. Mary's School	Landover Hills	–	–			
St. Mary's School	Rockville	–	1951			
St. Mary of the Assumption Catholic School	Upper Marlboro	Sisters, Servants of the Immaculate Heart of Mary	1925			
St. Mary of the Mills School	Laurel	Sisters of Mercy (former) Sisters of St. Joseph of Chestnut Hill (former) Pallottine Missionary Sisters	1893			
St. Mary's School of Piscataway	Clinton	Sinsinawa Dominican Sisters (former) Sisters of Mercy (former)	1962			
St. Mary, Star of the Sea Catholic School	Indian Head	–	–			
St. Michael's School	Ridge	Missionary Servants of the Blessed Trinity (former) Third Order of Carmelites (former) Society of Jesus (former) Sisters of St. Joseph (former)	1918			
St. Patrick's Catholic School	Rockville	–	1968			
St. Peter's School	Olney	Sisters of St. Joseph of Chestnut Hill (former)	1957			
St. Peter's School	Waldorf	–	1956			
St. Peter School	Washington, D.C.	Sisters of the Holy Cross (former)	1868		–	1960
St. Pius X Regional School	Bowie	Presentation Sisters (former) Sisters of St. Joseph of Chestnut Hill (former)	1962			
St. Raphael Nursery School	Rockville	–	1969			
St. Raphael School	Rockville	–	2006			
St. Thomas More Catholic Academy	Washington, D.C.	–	–			
Washington Jesuit Academy	Washington, D.C.	Society of Jesus	2001			
Washington Middle School for Girls	Washington, D.C.	Religious of Jesus and Mary Society of the Holy Child Jesus	1998			
Woods Academy	Bethesda	–	–			

== Former schools ==
=== Colleges and universities ===
School	Location	Religious order	Founded	Closed
Dunbarton College of the Holy Cross	Washington, D.C.	Sisters of the Holy Cross	1935	1973
Washington Theological Union	Washington, D.C.	Multiple orders	1968	2015

=== Secondary schools ===
School	Location	Religious order	Founded	Closed	Ref
Academy of Notre Dame	Washington, D.C.	Sisters of Notre Dame de Namur	1873	1989	
All Saints High School	Washington, D.C.	–	–	1989	
Holy Spirit High School	Washington, D.C.	–	–	1989	
Immaculate Conception Academy	Washington, D.C.	Daughters of Charity of St. Vincent de Paul	1872	1964	
La Reine High School	Suitland	Bernardine Sisters of St. Francis	1960	1991	
Leonard Hall	Leonardtown	Xaverian Brothers (former)	1909	1970s	
Mackin High School	Washington, D.C.	Congregation of Holy Cross	–	1989	
Northeast Catholic High School	Washington, D.C.	Benedictine Sisters	1922	–	
Notre Dame High School	Bryantown	Sisters of Notre Dame de Namur	1923	1967	
Regina High School	Adelphi	Religious of Jesus and Mary	1955	1989	
Ryken High School	Leonardtown	Xaverian Brothers	1956	1981	
St. Cecilia's Academy	Washington, D.C.	Sisters of the Holy Cross	1868	1951	
St. Mary's Academy	Leonardtown	Sisters of Charity of Nazareth	1885	1981	

=== Primary schools ===
School	Location	Religious order	Founded	Closed	Ref
Assumption School	Washington, D.C.	Sisters of the Holy Cross	1951	2008	
Holy Angels School	Avenue	Sisters of Charity of Nazareth	1926	1958	
Holy Angels–Sacred Heart School	Avenue	Sisters of Charity of Nazareth	1958	2009	
Holy Comforter–St. Cyprian School	Washington, D.C.	Sisters of St. Joseph of Chestnut Hill (former) Oblate Sisters of Providence (former)	1965	2008	
Holy Comforter School	Washington, D.C.	Sisters of St. Joseph of Chestnut Hill	1921	1965	
Holy Name of Jesus School	Washington, D.C.	–	–	2008	
Holy Redeemer School	Washington, D.C.	–	1955	–	
Immaculate Conception Academy	Washington, D.C.	Daughters of Charity of St. Vincent de Paul	1954	1984	
Immaculate Conception Boys School	Washington, D.C.	Marianist Brothers	1865	1964	
Immaculate Conception Girls School	Washington, D.C.	Sisters of Charity	1865	1872	
Immaculate Conception School	Washington, D.C.	Sisters of Mercy (former) Society of the Holy Child Jesus (former)	1964	2008	
Mount Calvary Catholic School	Forestville	School Sisters of Notre Dame	1950	2016	
Nativity Catholic Academy	Washington, D.C.	–	1925	2008	
Our Lady of Perpetual Help	Washington, D.C.	School Sisters of Notre Dame	1921	2007	
Our Lady's School	Medley's Neck	–	1924	–	
Our Lady Queen of Peace School	Washington, D.C.	–	1952	2003	
Our Lady of Sorrows School	Takoma Park	–	–	2006	
Sacred Heart School	Bushwood	Sisters of Charity of Nazareth	1926	1958	
St. Alphonsus School	St. Mary's City	–	1916	1922	
St. Ann's Academy	Washington, D.C.	–	–	2014	
St. Benedict Academy	Washington, D.C.	Benedictine Sisters	1905	1922	
St. Benedict the Moor School	Washington, D.C.	Oblate Sisters of Providence (former)	1962	2008	
St. Camillus School	Silver Spring	Sisters of Notre Dame de Namur	1954	2010	
St. Catherine Labouré School	Wheaton	–	1953	2013	
St. Cyprian's School	Washington, D.C.	Oblate Sisters of Providence	1892	1965	
St. David's School	Mount Rainier	Sisters of St. Joseph of Hartford	1918	1932	
St. Francis de Sales School	Washington, D.C.	Sisters of St. Joseph	1946	2008	
St. Gabriel School	Washington, D.C.	Sisters of the Holy Names of Jesus and Mary	1924	2008	
St. Hugh of Grenoble School	Greenbelt	–	1949	2010	
St. John Baptist de La Salle School	Chillum	Sisters of Charity of Cincinnati	1952	–	
St. Joseph's Colored School	Morganza	–	1927	1964	
St. Joseph's School	Morganza	Sisters of Charity of Nazareth	1924	1964	
St. Joseph's School	Washington, D.C.	–	1890	–	
St. Margaret of Scotland Catholic School	Seat Pleasant	Felician Sisters	1955	2007	
St. Mark the Evangelist School	Hyattsville	–	1958	2009	
St. Mary's Boarding School	Bryantown	Sisters of Notre Dame de Namur	1921	1931	
St. Mary's Colored School	Bryantown	Sisters of Notre Dame de Namur	1915	1967	
St. Michael the Archangel School	Silver Spring	–	–	2012	
St. Nicholas School	Laurel	–	–	2010	
St. Patrick's Academy	Washington, D.C.	Sisters of the Holy Cross	1865	1985	
St. Paul School	Washington, D.C.	–	–	1961	
St. Peter Claver School	St. Inigoes	Oblate Sisters of Providence	1916	–	
St. Philip the Apostle Catholic School	Camp Springs		1960	2025	
St. Rose's Industrial School	Washington, D.C.	Daughters of Charity of St. Vincent de Paul	1872	–	
St. Stephen's Parish School for Boys	Washington, D.C.	Daughters of Charity of St. Vincent de Paul	1872	1879	
St. Stephen's School	Washington, D.C.	Sisters of Notre Dame de Namur	1924	1954	
St. Teresa of Avila School	Washington, D.C.	Congregation of the Sacred Hearts of Jesus and Mary	1900s	1972	
St. Thomas the Apostle School	Washington, D.C.	–	–	–	
