= Elizabeth Seton High School =

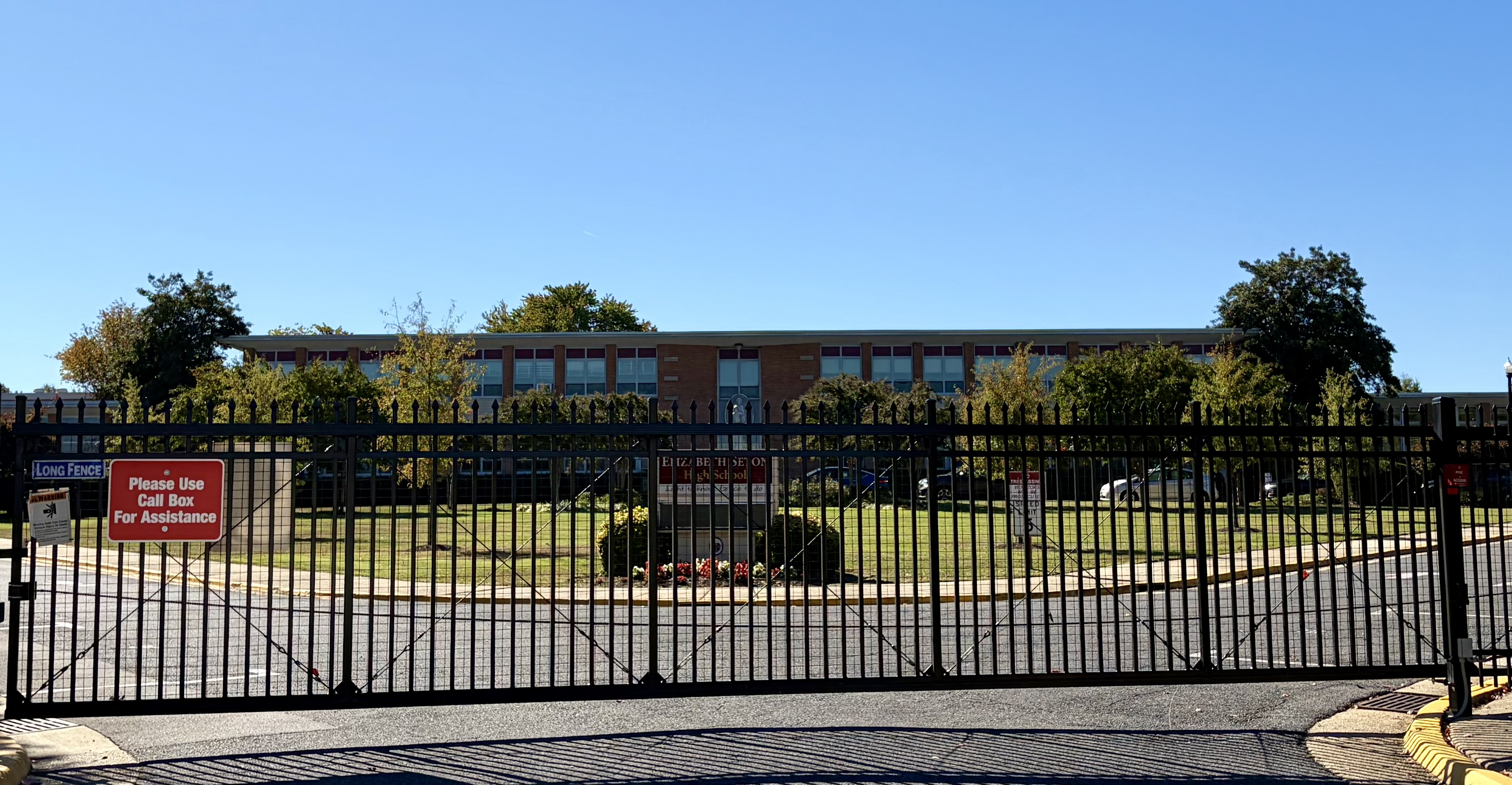
- Elizabeth Seton High School in 2025.

Location
- 5715 Emerson Street; Bladensburg, (Prince George's County), Maryland 20710; United States
- 38°56′47″N 76°54′52″W

Information
- Type: Private
- Motto: Light To Know. Grace To Do.
- Religious affiliations: Roman Catholic (Daughters of Charity)
- Established: 1959
- School district: Archdiocese of Washington Catholic Schools
- CEEB code: 210273
- President: Dr. Lisa Grillo '89
- Principal: Vanessa Cooke (interim)
- Faculty: 37
- Teaching staff: 49
- Grades: 9–12
- Gender: Girls
- Average class size: 18
- Student to teacher ratio: 13:1
- Campus size: 24-acre (97,000 m^{2}) campus
- Colors: Scarlet, Gold, and White
- Slogan: "stronger through sisterhood"
- Song: Elizabeth Seton High School Song
- Athletics conference: WCAC
- Sports: 24 athletic teams
- Mascot: Roadrunner
- Team name: Roadrunners
- Accreditation: MSA
- Newspaper: The Roadrunner Review
- Yearbook: Caritas
- Tuition: $19,077.00
- Website: setonhs.org

Elizabeth Seton High School is a private, all-girls Catholic high school in Bladensburg, Maryland. It is located in the Archdiocese of Washington.

== History ==
Elizabeth Seton High School was established on March 15, 1957, and opened with an enrollment of 138 freshmen and a faculty of six Daughters of Charity in September 1959.

As early as 1965, the Maryland State Department of Education issued a Certificate of Approval to the school and in 1968 the Middle States Association of Colleges and Secondary Schools accredited it.

Elizabeth Seton was named one of 10 private schools of distinction by The Washington Post in 2005.

== Description ==
Seton covers grades 9–12 and can hold about 650 students.

The school was named in honor of the American Catholic saint Elizabeth Ann Seton. The school colors are scarlet, gold, and white. The mascot is a roadrunner. The school motto is "Light to know. Grace to do."

=== Enrollment ===
- Grades 9-12: 552 (2016–2017)
- Student/teacher ratio: 13-1
- Average class size: 16
- Student/computer ratio: 7.5-1; 1:1 Beginning with the class of 2019
- Class of 2015: 109

== Notable alumni ==
- Class of 1990: Muriel Bowser, current mayor of Washington, D.C.
