= The Avalon School =

Location
- 11811 Claridge Rd. Wheaton, Maryland 20902; United States; 39°02′55.6″N 77°04′01.1″W

Information
- Type: Private independent day school
- Motto: Duc in Altum ("Put out into the deep" Luke 5:4)
- Religious affiliation: Independent Roman Catholic
- Established: 2003
- School district: Archdiocese of Washington Catholic Schools
- President: Richard McPherson
- Headmaster: Kevin Davern
- Chaplain: Roberto Amoruso FSCB
- Grades: K–12
- Gender: Boys
- Average class size: 15
- Houses: Stewart, Calvert, Carroll, Washington
- Colors: Black, Gold, and Red
- Song: The Minstrel Boy
- Athletics: Football, soccer, cross country, basketball, baseball
- Athletics conference: The Old Line Baseball Conference(OLBC); Metro Independent School Athletic League(MISAL)
- Mascot: Black Knight
- Nickname: Black Knights
- Newspaper: The Chronicles
- Tuition: $19,255 for Upper school
- CFO: Barry Stohlman
- Advancement: Charmie Vince
- Executive Director: R.J. Hawley
- Houses: Jim Bostick
- Website: www.avalonschools.org

The Avalon School is a private independent day school for boys currently in Wheaton, Maryland, United States. It is associated with the Brookewood School, a private school for girls in Kensington, Maryland, and the Thomas More Institute, an umbrella program for homeschoolers.

== Notable alumni ==
- Trevon Diggs, NFL player
- Joshua Pitsenberger, NFL Player
