= Brookewood School =

Brookewood School for Girls

Location
- 10401 Armory Ave; Kensington, Maryland 20895; Montgomery County; United States
- Coordinates: 39°1′35.3″N 77°4′28.3″W

Information
- Type: Private, All-Female
- Motto: Nolite Timere (Be Not Afraid)
- Religious affiliation: An Independent School teaching the Catholic Catechism
- School district: Archdiocese of Washington Catholic Schools
- President: Richard McPherson
- Headmaster: Richard McPherson
- Grades: K–12
- Average class size: 13
- Colors: Navy, White, Red
- Athletics: Lacrosse, Field Hockey, Volleyball, Basketball, Soccer
- Mascot: Bengal Tiger
- Newspaper: "The Biz"
- Website: www.brookewood.org

Brookewood School is a private independent day school for girls located in Kensington, Maryland. It is associated with The Avalon School, a private school for boys in Wheaton, Maryland, and the Thomas More Institute, an umbrella program for homeschoolers. It is a Catholic school with a student/teacher ratio of 7:1. Brookewood School recently celebrated its 10-year anniversary in 2016.
