= Joshua Pitsenberger =

American football player (born 2002)

Josh Pitsenberger

No. 31 – Houston Texans
- Position: Running back
- Roster status: Practice squad

Personal information
- Listed height: 6 ft 0 in (1.83 m)
- Listed weight: 215 lb (98 kg)

Career information
- High school: The Avalon School (Wheaton, Maryland)
- College: Yale (2022–2025)
- NFL draft: 2026: undrafted

Career history
- Houston Texans (2026–present)*
- * Offseason or practice squad member only

Awards and highlights
- Bushnell Cup (2025); 2× First-team All-Ivy League (2022, 2025); 2× Second-team All-Ivy League (2023, 2024); Ivy League Rookie of the Year (2022)

Josh Pitsenberger is an American professional football running back for the Houston Texans of the National Football League (NFL). He played college football the Yale Bulldogs and was signed by the Texans as an undrafted free agent.

== Early life ==
Pitsenberger grew up in Bethesda, Maryland and attended The Avalon School. He rushed for 1,156 yards and 13 touchdowns on 188 carries as a senior.

== College career ==
Pitsenberger was named the Ivy League Rookie of the Year and first-team All-Ivy League during his freshman season with the Yale Bulldogs after rushing for 667 yards and six touchdowns while catching ten passes for 53 yards and a touchdown. As a senior Pitsenberger won the Bushnell Cup as the Ivy League's top offensive player after rushing for 1,571 yards and 19 touchdowns. Pitsenberger finished his college career as Yale's second-leading rusher with 3,435 yards and 41 rushing touchdowns.

== Professional career ==
Pre-draft measurables
Height	Weight	Arm length	Hand span	Wingspan	40-yard dash	10-yard split	20-yard split	20-yard shuttle	Three-cone drill	Vertical jump	Broad jump	Bench press
5 ft 11 3/4 in (1.82 m)	221 lb (100 kg)	30 in (0.76 m)	10 in (0.25 m)	5 ft 10 in (1.78 m)	4.64 s	1.62 s	2.62 s	4.12 s	6.94 s	35.0 in (0.89 m)	9 ft 7 in (2.92 m)	20 reps
All values from Pro Day

Pitsenberger signed with the Houston Texans as an undrafted free agent on May 8, 2026. He was placed on injured reserve on August 15, after suffering an ankle injury in the Texans' first preseason game. On August 24, Pitsenberger was waived by the Texans with an injury settlement. He was re-signed to the practice squad on November 2.
