= Trevon Diggs =

American football player (born 1998)

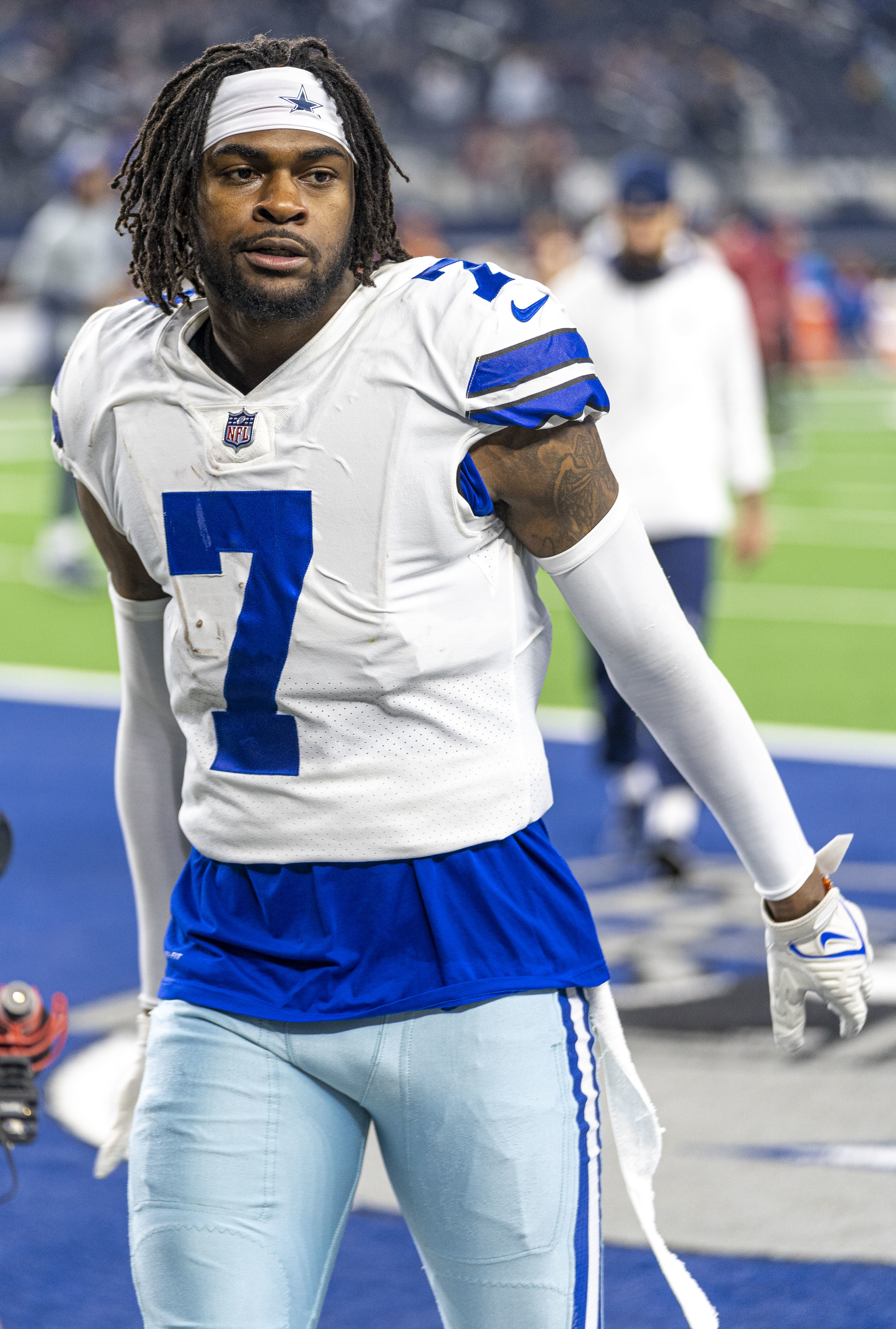
- Diggs with the Dallas Cowboys in 2021

No. 16 – Seattle Seahawks
- Position: Cornerback
- Roster status: Practice squad

Personal information
- Born: September 20, 1998 (age 28); Gaithersburg, Maryland, U.S.
- Listed height: 6 ft 1 in (1.85 m)
- Listed weight: 203 lb (92 kg)

Career information
- High school: The Avalon School (Wheaton, Maryland)
- College: Alabama (2016–2019)
- NFL draft: 2020: 2nd round, 51st overall pick

Career history
- Dallas Cowboys (2020–2025); Green Bay Packers (2025); Seattle Seahawks (2026–present)

Awards and highlights
- First-team All-Pro (2021); 2× Pro Bowl (2021, 2022); NFL interceptions leader (2021); CFP national champion (2017); Third-team All-American (2019); First-team All-SEC (2019)

Career NFL statistics as of Week 10, 2026
- Total tackles: 243
- Sacks: 1.0
- Forced fumbles: 2
- Fumble recoveries: 1
- Pass deflections: 63
- Interceptions: 20
- Defensive touchdowns: 2
- Stats at Pro Football Reference

Trevon De'Sean Diggs (born September 20, 1998) is an American professional football cornerback for the Seattle Seahawks of the National Football League (NFL). He played college football for the Alabama Crimson Tide and was selected by the Dallas Cowboys in the second round of the 2020 NFL draft. He is the younger brother of wide receiver Stefon Diggs.

== Early life ==
Diggs initially attended Thomas S. Wootton High School in Rockville, Maryland. After his sophomore year, he decided to transfer to The Avalon School in Wheaton, Maryland, to follow his football coach Tyree Spinner.

He played defensive back and wide receiver in high school. As a junior, he tallied 78 receptions for 1,008 yards and 15 touchdowns. As a senior, he had 1,269 receiving yards. He was a two-time All-Washington, D.C. Metro selection at receiver. He committed to the University of Alabama to play college football.

== College career ==
As a true freshman at Alabama in 2016, Diggs played safety, wide receiver, and was a return specialist. He finished the year with five tackles and one forced fumble on defense, 11 receptions for 88 yards and a touchdown on offense and had 296 total return yards on special teams.

As a sophomore in 2017, Diggs switched to cornerback full-time. He was a starter for the season opener against Florida State, before being passed on the depth chart by Levi Wallace. He posted six tackles and three passes defended. He also played on special teams, returning 18 punts for 154 yards with a long of 21 yards, and two kickoffs for 74 yards.

As a junior in 2018, Diggs started the first six games of the season, before being lost for the year with a broken foot he suffered against Arkansas. He finished the year with 20 tackles and an interception.

As a senior in 2019, he started 12 games, while registering 37 tackles, three interceptions (tied for second on the team), eight passes defended (tied for the team lead) and two fumble recoveries, including a 100-yard touchdown return against Tennessee. He returned an interception for an 84-yard touchdown, recovered two fumbles (one for a touchdown) and had 100-plus combined return yards against Arkansas. He had a career-high 10 tackles against LSU.

== Professional career ==
=== Pre-draft ===
NFL draft analysts projected Diggs to be selected in the late-first to the second round of the 2020 NFL Draft. NFL analyst Bill Huber ranked Diggs as the second best cornerback prospect in the draft. Kevin Hanson of Sports Illustrated and Ryan Wilson of CBS Sports had Diggs ranked as the fourth best cornerback prospect. Pro Football Focus ranked him sixth (31st overall) amongst all cornerbacks in the draft. Dane Brugler of the Athletic had Diggs ranked as the fourth best prospect amongst his position group. Bob Sturm of the Athletic had Diggs listed as the eighth best cornerback prospect available in the draft.

External videos
- Tre'von Diggs's NFL Draft Highlights

Pre-draft measurables
Height	Weight	Arm length	Hand span	Wingspan
6 ft 1 3/8 in (1.86 m)	205 lb (93 kg)	32 3/4 in (0.83 m)	9 3/8 in (0.24 m)	6 ft 6 3/8 in (1.99 m)
All values from NFL Combine

=== Dallas Cowboys ===
==== 2020 ====
The Dallas Cowboys selected Diggs in the second round (51st overall) of the 2020 NFL draft. He was the eighth cornerback drafted in 2020 and was selected by the Dallas Cowboys as a replacement for the recently departed Byron Jones.

External videos
- Cowboys select Tre'von Diggs at No. 51
- ESPN NFL draft profile: Tre'von Diggs

"Doesn’t take long when you are watching the tape: smooth, long athletic and we are putting such an emphasis on turnover ratio. That will be a big part of our daily focus as a football team and this young man goes and gets the football. So, the way we want to play, particularly in the back end, I think he also is an excellent fit.”

— Mike McCarthy (Cowboys' head coach)

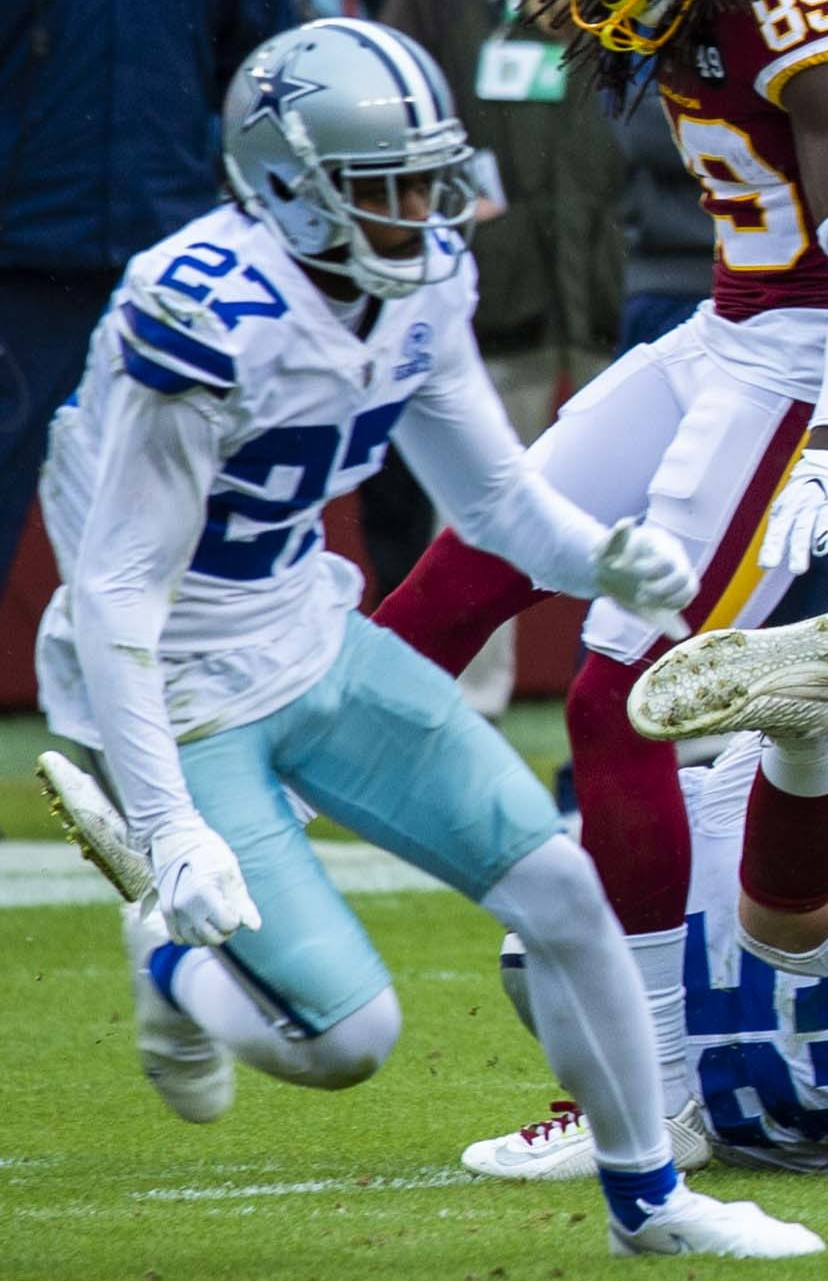
Diggs playing for the Cowboys in his rookie season.

On July 26, 2020, the Dallas Cowboys signed Diggs to a four–year, $6.32 million rookie contract that included $3.04 million guaranteed and a signing bonus of $2.15 million. Throughout training camp, he competed to be the No. 1 starting cornerback against Anthony Brown, Chidobe Awuzie, and Jourdan Lewis under defensive coordinator Mike Nolan. Head coach Mike McCarthy named Diggs the No. 1 starting cornerback to begin the season and paired him with Anthony Brown.

On September 13, 2020, Diggs made his professional regular season debut and earned his first career start in the Dallas Cowboys' season-opener at the Los Angeles Rams and recorded three combined tackles (two solo) during a 17–20 loss. In Week 3, he set a season-high with nine solo tackles and had one pass deflection, while also making a highlight-reel play by continuing to chase down wide receiver D. K. Metcalf as he was about to enter the endzone for a 62-yard touchdown reception thrown by Russell Wilson during the first quarter and punched the ball out of the grasp of Metcalf to cause a fumble that exited the back of the endzone for a touchback, although the Cowboys still lost 31–38 at the Seattle Seahawks. In Week 4, Diggs had eight combined tackles (four solo) and recorded his first career sack on Baker Mayfield during a 49–38 loss to the Cleveland Browns. On November 1, 2020, Diggs started on Sunday Night Football at the Philadelphia Eagles and made seven combined tackles (six solo), set a season-high with four pass deflections, and had the first two interceptions of his career during their 23–9 loss. He had his first career interception during a pass attempt by Carson Wentz to wide receiver Jalen Reagor in the second quarter. In Week 9, Diggs had seven solo tackles before exiting in the fourth quarter of the Cowboys' 19–24 loss to the Pittsburgh Steelers due to an injury to his foot that he continued to play through until it became apparent to staff. On November 18, 2020, the Cowboys officially placed him on injured reserve after it was discovered he had fractured his foot and was expected to miss the remainder of the season due to a 4–6 week recovery. On December 19, 2020, the Cowboys activated Diggs from injured reserve and added him back to their active roster after he was able to recover from his foot injury after being inactive for four games (Weeks 11–14). With their bye week occurring in Week 10, Diggs recovered from his fractured foot in five weeks. On December 27, 2020, he made one solo tackle, one pass deflection, and sealed the Cowboys' 37–17 win against the Philadelphia Eagles by intercepting a pass by Jalen Hurts to wide receiver Jalen Reagor with 45 seconds remaining. He finished his rookie campaign during the 2020 NFL season with a total of 58 combined tackles (42 solo), 14 passes defended (led the team), three interceptions (led the team), one forced fumble, and a sack while appearing in 12 games with 11 starts. He reportedly was plagued with knee and shoulder injuries throughout his rookie season. He received an overall grade of 62.7 from Pro Football Focus in 2020.

==== 2021 ====
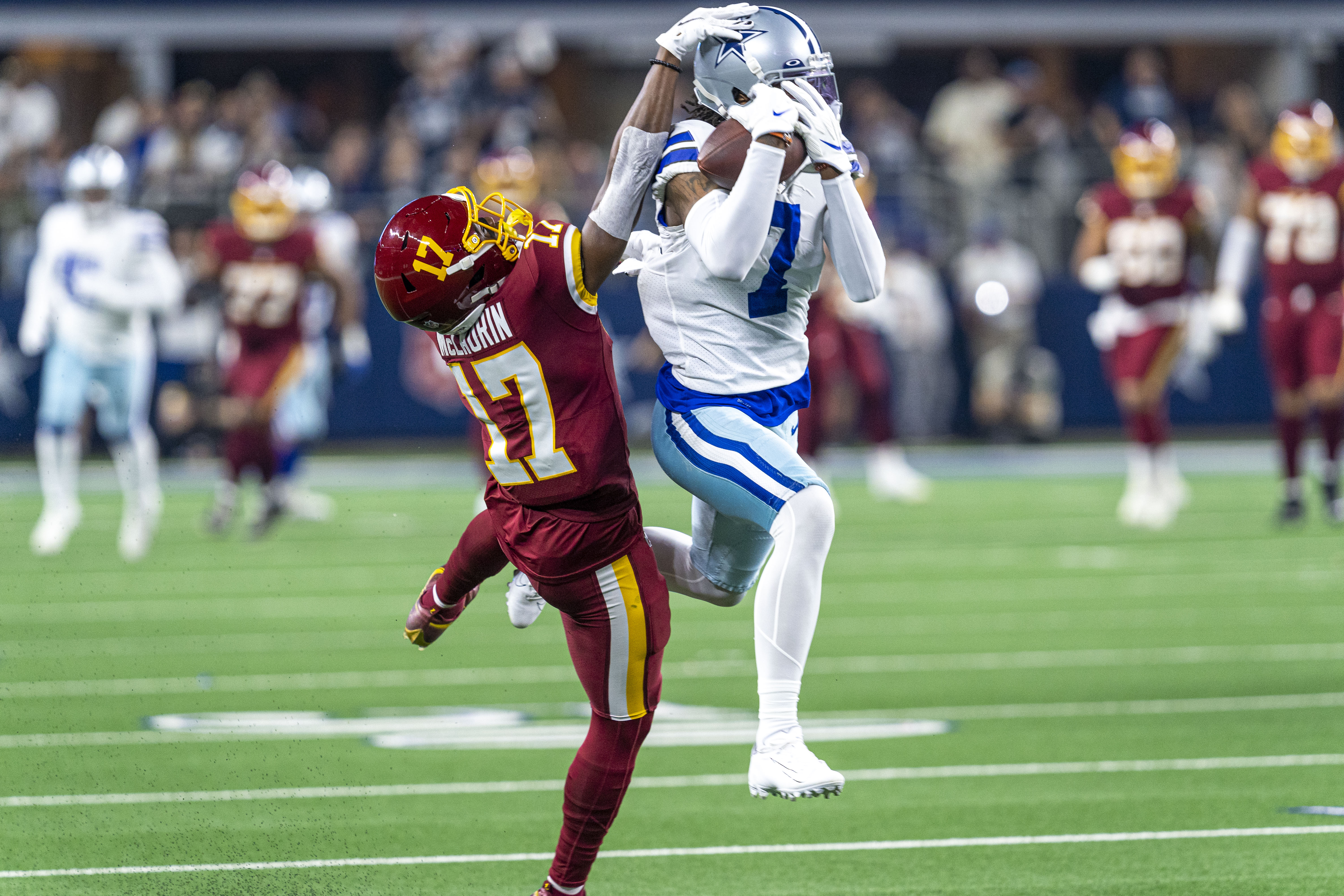
Digg recording his 11th interception of the 2021 season

On January 11, 2021, the Dallas Cowboys announced their decision to hire former Atlanta Falcons' head coach Dan Quinn as their new defensive coordinator, replacing Mike Nolan after he was fired three days prior. He entered training camp slated as the No. 1 starting cornerback and led a group of cornerbacks that included rookies Kelvin Joseph and Nahshon Wright. He was named a starting cornerback to begin the season and was paired with Anthony Brown and Jourdan Lewis as the starting nickelback.

On September 9, 2021, Diggs started in the Cowboys' season-opener at the Tampa Bay Buccaneers and had one solo tackle, two pass deflections, and made his first interception of the season on a pass thrown by Tom Brady to running back Leonard Fournette during a 29–31 loss, kicking off his interception streak. In Week 2, he set a season-high with six solo tackles, made a pass deflection, and had his second interception after picking off a pass by Justin Herbert to wide receiver Keenan Allen during a 20–17 win at the Los Angeles Chargers. On September 27, 2021, he recorded two solo tackles, set a season-high with three pass deflections, and scored his first career touchdown on a pick-six after intercepting a pass by Jalen Hurts to wide receiver DeVonta Smith and returning it 59–yards for a touchdown at the start of the second half as the Cowboys defeated the Philadelphia Eagles 41–21. He was awarded the NFC Defensive Player of the Month for September. On October 3, 2021, Diggs made four solo tackles, two pass deflections, and set a season-high with two interceptions off passes thrown by Sam Darnold during a 36–28 win over the Carolina Panthers, earning him NFC Defensive Player of the Week honors. In Week 6, Diggs had five solo tackles, one pass deflection, and had his second pick-six after intercepting a pass by Mac Jones to Kendrick Bourne and returned it for a 24-yard touchdown late in the fourth quarter to aide the Cowboys to a 35–29 overtime victory at the New England Patriots. This became his sixth consecutive game with an interception to begin the season, tying Brian Russell (2003) for the NFL record. Diggs also joined Hall of Famer Rod Woodson in recording seven interceptions in the first six games of a season. In Week 13, he made four solo tackles, one pass deflection, and helped secure a 27–17 victory at the New Orleans Saints by intercepting a pass by Taysom Hill to wide receiver Deonte Harty late in the fourth quarter. On December 26, 2021, Diggs made two solo tackles, two pass deflections, and set his career-high with his 11th interception of the season on a pass thrown by Taylor Heinicke to wide receiver Terry McLaurin on Washington's first offensive play of the game during a 27–20 victory at the Washington Football Team. He tied the Cowboys' franchise record for most interceptions in a single-season record held by Everson Walls (1981). On January 6, 2022, the Cowboys announced Diggs was placed in COVID-19 protocol and would be inactive for their Week 18 matchup at the Philadelphia Eagles. He had a league-leading 11 interceptions, which was also the highest single-season mark by any NFL player since Walls in 1981. He also registered 56 combined tackles (42 solo) and 21 passes defensed (led the team) in 16 games and 16 starts. His breakout season earned him First Team All-Pro recognition. He was ranked 23rd by his fellow players on the NFL Top 100 Players of 2022. He received an overall grade of 59.6 from Pro Football Focus in 2021.

==== 2022 ====
He entered training camp slated as the de facto No. 1 starting cornerback. Head coach Mike McCarthy named him and Anthony Brown the starting cornerbacks to begin the season.

On September 26, 2022, Diggs made one solo tackle, three pass deflections, and secured a 23–16 win at the New York Giants by intercepting a pass by Daniel Jones to wide receiver David Sills with 1:17 left in the game. The following week, he tied his season-high of three pass deflections and intercepted a pass thrown by Carson Wentz to wide receiver Jahan Dotson during a 25–10 win against the Washington Commanders in Week 4. In Week 8, he collected a season-high eight combined tackles (six solo) as the Cowboys defeated the Chicago Bears 49–29. He started in all 17 games for the first time in his career and had a total of 59 combined tackles (50 solo), 14 pass deflections, three interceptions, and one fumble recovery. He earned Pro Bowl honors for the 2022 season. He was ranked 60th by his fellow players on the NFL Top 100 Players of 2023. Pro Football Focus had him finish the 2022 NFL season with an overall grade of 66.9.

==== 2023 ====
On July 25, 2023, the Dallas Cowboys signed Diggs to a five–year, $97.00 million contract extension that includes $42.30 million guaranteed, $33.30 million guaranteed upon signing, and an initial signing bonus of $21.25 million. The entire contract has a maximum value of $104 million with incentives and potential bonuses. He returned as the starting cornerback to begin the season and was paired with Stephon Gilmore.

On September 10, 2023, Diggs started in the Dallas Cowboys' season-opener at the New York Giants and set a season-high with three solo tackles and made one pass deflection as they won 40–0. In Week 2, Diggs had one solo tackle, a season-high two pass deflections, and made his lone interception of the season on a pass by Zach Wilson to running back Michael Carter during a 30–10 win against the New York Jets. On September 21, 2023, Diggs tore the ACL in his left knee during 1-on-1 drills in practice. He was later ruled out for the rest of the season. He underwent surgery and was inactive for the remaining 15 games (Weeks 3–18) of the season. He was limited to four solo tackles, three pass deflections, and one interception in two games and two starts. He received an overall grade of 80.7 from Pro Football Focus in 2023.

==== 2024 ====
On February 12, 2024, the Dallas Cowboys hired Mike Zimmer to be their defensive coordinator, following the departure of Dan Quinn, who left to become head coach for the Washington Commanders. He started training camp on the PUP (physically unable to perform) list, as he was still recovering from his torn ACL. Head coach Mike McCarthy named him the No. 1 starting cornerback to begin the season and paired him with rookie Caelen Carson after DaRon Bland sustained a stress fracture during training camp.

On September 8, 2024, Diggs started in the Dallas Cowboys' season-opener at the Cleveland Browns and made five combined tackles (four solo), a pass deflection, and intercepted a pass by Deshaun Watson to wide receiver Elijah Moore during a 33–17 victory. In Week 10, he had one pass deflection and intercepted a pass in the endzone thrown by Jalen Hurts to tight end Dallas Goedert during a 6–34 loss to the Philadelphia Eagles. The following week, he set a season-high with six solo tackles and had one pass deflection during a 10–34 loss at the Houston Texans in Week 11. He was inactive for the next two games (Weeks 12–13) due to a groin injury. On December 14, 2024, the Cowboys announced that Diggs would miss the rest of the season and would undergo surgery to repair a knee injury in the same leg as his ACL tear the prior year, which he had been dealing with for most of the season. He remained inactive for the last four games (Weeks 15–18) of the season. He finished the 2024 NFL season with a total of 42 combined tackles (35 solo), 11 pass deflections, and two interceptions in 11 games and 11 starts. He received an overall grade of 56.6 from Pro Football Focus in 2024, ranking 144th among 222 qualifying cornerbacks.

==== 2025 ====
On October 25, 2025, Diggs was placed on injured reserve due to lingering concussion symptoms. He was activated on December 20, ahead of the team's Week 16 game against the Los Angeles Chargers. In eight total appearances (six start) for Dallas, Diggs recorded 25 combined tackles. On December 30, Diggs was released by the Cowboys.

=== Green Bay Packers ===
On December 31, 2025, Diggs was claimed off waivers by the Green Bay Packers. He made two appearances for the team in their season finale and Wild Card game, recording three combined tackles. On January 20, 2026, Diggs was released by the Packers.

=== Seattle Seahawks ===
On August 19, 2026, Diggs signed a one-year contract with the Seattle Seahawks. He was released by the Seahawks on August 30 as a part of final roster cuts, and re-signed a day later with the practice squad. Diggs was signed to the active roster on October 10. He was released and re-signed to the practice squad on October 23.

== NFL career statistics ==
Legend
	Led the league
**Bold**	Career high

=== Regular season ===
Year	Team	Games		Tackles				Interceptions						Fumbles			
Year	Team	GP	GS	Cmb	Solo	Ast	Sck	Int	Yds	Avg	Lng	TD	PD	FF	FR	Yds	TD
2020	DAL	12	11	58	49	**9**	**1.0**	3	43	**14.3**	33	0	14	**1**	0	0	0
2021	DAL	16	16	52	43	**9**	0.0	**11**	**142**	12.9	**59**	**2**	**21**	0	0	0	0
2022	DAL	17	17	**59**	**50**	**9**	0.0	3	10	3.3	7	0	14	0	**1**	**17**	0
2023	DAL	2	2	4	4	0	0.0	1	8	8.0	8	0	3	**1**	0	0	0
2024	DAL	11	11	52	45	7	0.0	2	1	0.5	1	0	11	0	0	0	0
2025	DAL	8	6	25	18	7	0.0	0	0	0.0	0	0	0	0	0	0	0
2025	GB	1	1	2	2	0	0.0	0	0	0.0	0	0	0	0	0	0	0
2026	SEA	5	0	1	1	0	0.0	0	0	0.0	0	0	0	0	0	0	0
Career		72	64	243	202	41	1.0	20	204	10.2	59	2	63	2	1	17	0
Source: pro-football-reference.com

=== Postseason ===
Year	Team	Games		Tackles				Interceptions						Fumbles			
Year	Team	GP	GS	Cmb	Solo	Ast	Sck	Int	Yds	Avg	Lng	TD	PD	FF	FR	Yds	TD
2021	DAL	1	1	4	**4**	0	0.0	0	0	0.0	0	0	0	0	0	0	0
2022	DAL	2	2	**6**	3	**3**	0.0	0	0	0.0	0	0	0	0	0	0	0
2025	GB	1	0	1	0	1	0.0	0	0	0.0	0	0	0	0	0	0	0
Career		4	3	11	7	4	0.0	0	0	0.0	0	0	0	0	0	0	0
Source: pro-football-reference.com

== Personal life ==
Diggs has two sons, Aaiden (born November 2016, with Sierra Danielle) and Chosen Alexander (born August 2021, with Yasmine Lopez), and a daughter Harlo Rose (born August 2024, with Joie Chavis).

Diggs has two older brothers, Darez (born 1995) and Stefon (born 1993). Stefon played wide receiver for the University of Maryland Terrapins and is currently a wide receiver for the Washington Commanders. Darez played for Friendship Collegiate Academy Public Charter School in Washington, D.C., the UAB Blazers, and the Morgan State Bears. Diggs' father Aron died in January 2008 at the age of 39 due to congestive heart failure.
