= Our Lady of Lourdes Catholic School (Bethesda, Maryland) =

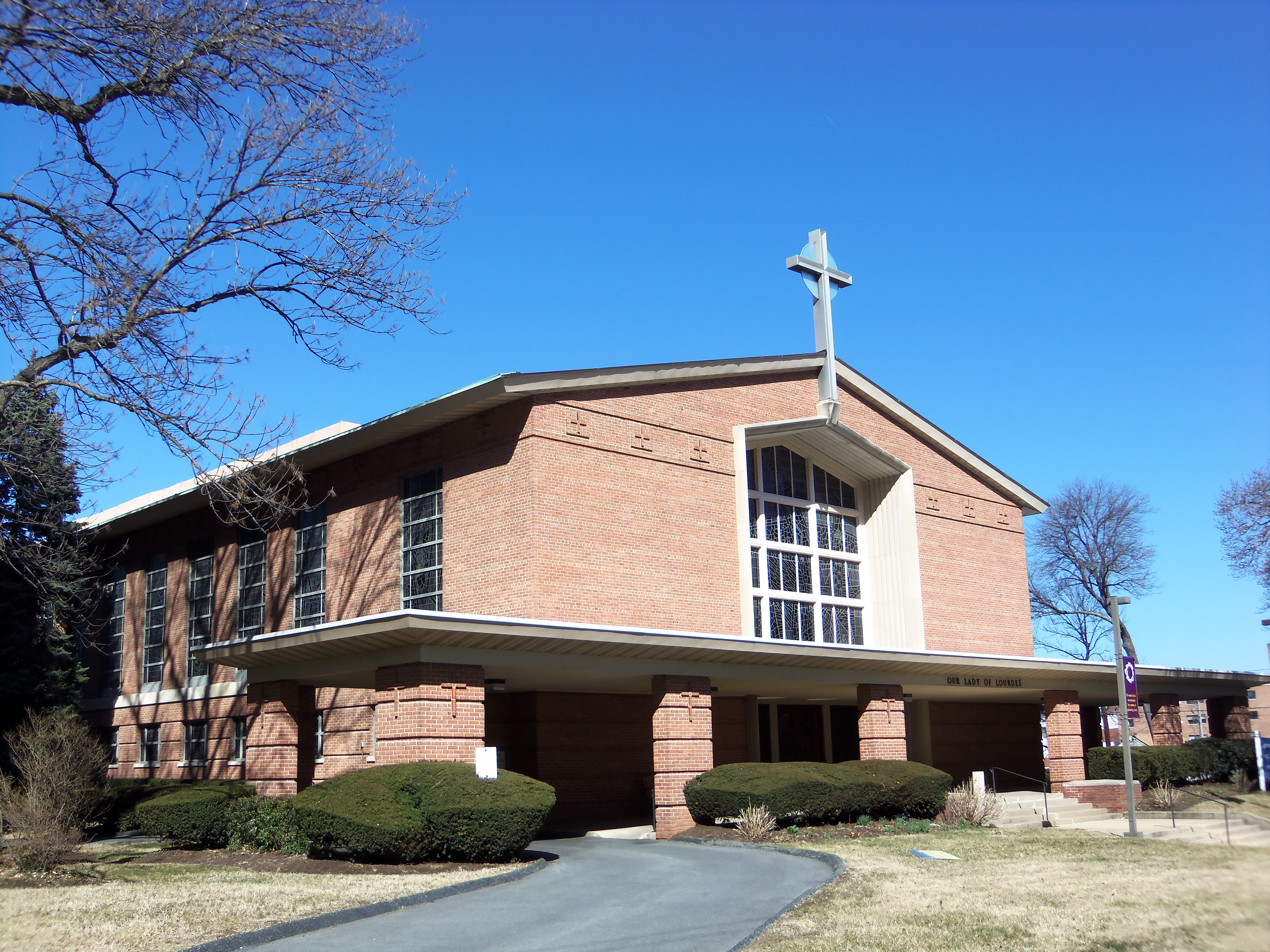
- Our Lady of Lourdes Church

Location
- 7500 Pearl Street; Bethesda, Maryland 20814; United States; 38°59′9.6″N 77°05′29.6″W

Information
- Denomination: Roman Catholic
- Established: 1941
- Authority: Archdiocese of Washington
- Principal: Ms. Amy Moore
- Grades: Pre-K through 8th
- Gender: Co-ed
- Enrollment: 275
- Colors: Blue and Gold
- Mascot: Lions
- Website: bethesda-lourdes.org

Our Lady of Lourdes Catholic School is a private primary school serving pre-kindergarten through 8th grade located in Bethesda, Maryland. The school is affiliated with Our Lady of Lourdes Church and is a part of the Roman Catholic Archdiocese of Washington's school system.

== History ==
Our Lady of Lourdes was founded in 1941 when the parish undertook a building drive which included a school building and a convent. The school's gymnasium served as the church until the present church structure was completed in 1951. The school was expanded in 1951 by the addition of six classrooms on the north end of the building. The gymnasium was renovated in 2001 and the turf field was installed in 2007.

== Notable alumni ==
- Martin O'Malley, governor of Maryland
- Taylor Momsen, singer-songwriter and former actress.
