= Saint Stephen Martyr Catholic Church (Washington, D.C.) =

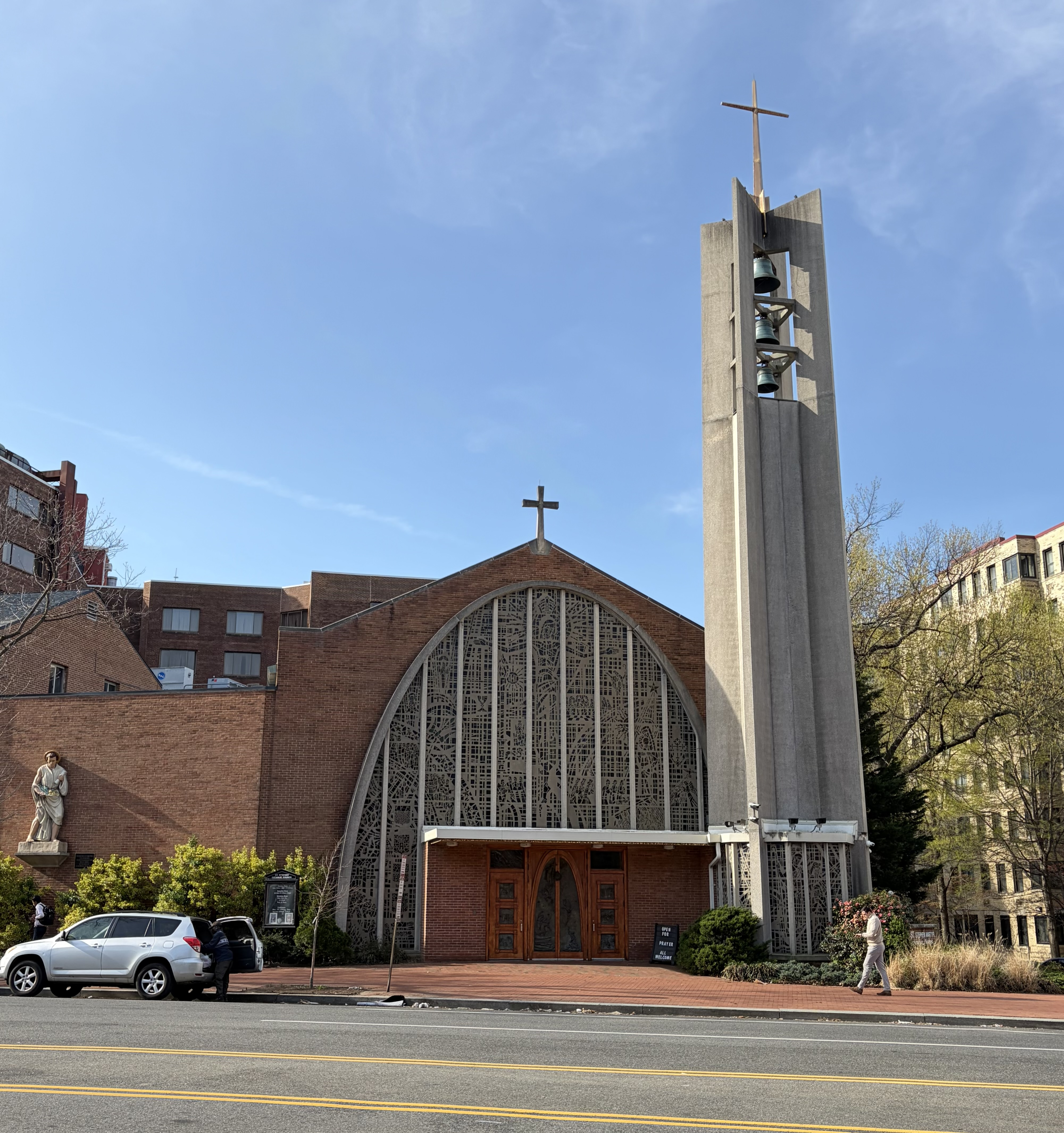
- Saint Stephen Martyr Catholic Church on Pennsylvania Avenue NW in Washington, D.C

- Location within Central Washington, D.C.
- 38°54′11.6202″N 77°3′10.677″W
- Location: 2436 Pennsylvania Avenue NW, Washington, D.C.
- Country: United States
- Denomination: Roman Catholic Church
- Website: ststephenmartyrdc.org

History
- Status: Parish church
- Founded: August 4, 1867
- Dedication: Saint Stephen
- Dedicated: December 27, 1868–July 15, 1959 (original bldg.); June 11, 1961 (new bldg.)

Architecture
- Functional status: Active
- Completed: 1961
- Construction cost: $650,000 ($7,003,062 in 2025 dollars)

Specifications
- Capacity: 700
- Materials: Reinforced concrete, stone, brick

Administration
- Archdiocese: Archdiocese of Washington

Clergy
- Archbishop: Cardinal Robert McElroy
- Priest: Msgr. Paul Dudziak

Saint Stephen Martyr Catholic Church is a Catholic parish church located at 2436 Pennsylvania Avenue NW in Washington, D.C., in the United States. The parish was founded on August 4, 1867, and the first church building consecrated and used for worship on December 27, 1868. This brick structure closed on July 15, 1959, and the current new building was consecrated and first used for worship on June 11, 1961. The church was a favorite of President John F. Kennedy.

== Establishment of the parish and construction of the original structure ==
In the summer of 1865, Martin John Spalding, Roman Catholic Archbishop of Baltimore, suggested to the Reverend Dr. C.I. White, pastor at St. Matthew the Apostle Catholic Church in Washington, D.C., that a new parish be created in the city's west end to meet the needs of the area's rapidly growing Roman Catholic population. Dr. White purchased land at the corner of 24th Street and Pennsylvania Avenue (today 2436 Pennsylvania Avenue NW) from a Dr. Newman at a cost of $8,575 ($180,355 in 2025 dollars) for the parish church, and began raising money for the building. The cornerstone for the new brick structure was laid on June 3, 1866.

The parish of Saint Stephen in Washington, D.C., was established on August 4, 1867, when the Rev. John McNally, formerly assistant pastor of St. Matthew the Apostle Church, was appointed the first pastor of the parish. A Solemn Mass was held at St. Matthew's to celebrate McNally's installation and creation of the parish. St. Stephen's became the ninth Roman Catholic parish established in the city.

The original red brick church and rectory were designed by Adolf Cluss, one of the most important architects working in the District of Columbia in the mid-1800s. Construction on and fundraising for Saint Stephen Martyr Church continued simultaneously. Construction on the basement (which contained the parish hall) was originally to be finished by mid-October 1867, but it was not complete until December. But work was far enough along for the first mass to be said in the church basement on October 27, 1867. Saint Stephen Martyr Church was dedicated on December 29, 1867. Father Francis X. Boyle of St. Peter's Catholic Church on Capitol Hill said mass and preached. At this time, Father McNally estimated the main building would be complete in the spring of 1868.

Father McNally's estimate was once more optimistic, for Saint Stephen Martyr Church was not completed until the end of the year. The church was consecrated on December 27, 1868, by the Very Reverend Dr. Thomas Foley, secretary to Archbishop Spalding. The Rev. Dr. C.I. White of St. Matthew's celebrated mass, while Dr. Foley preached the sermon. The adjacent church rectory was also completed at this time. The total cost of constructing the two buildings was about $51,425 ($1,243,842 in 2025 dollars). Work continued inside the church for some time after its consecration. The $300 ($7,256 in 2025 dollars) altar was not finished until February 1869.

== Parish school and expansion ==
Sunday school began at St. Stephen Martyr on January 5, 1868, but Father McNally wanted a parochial school as well, and fundraising for and construction of a $2,200 ($53,213 in 2025 dollars) structure began the following year. St. Stephen's Parish School for Boys opened in 1872, with about 50 pupils aged 5 to 13 in attendance. The same year, the Daughters of Charity of Saint Vincent de Paul opened St. Rose's Industrial School within the parish as well. This school accepted orphans who were cared for by St. Ann's Infant and Maternity Home, which was also located within the parish (but had been founded in 1861). St. Stephen's Parish School closed in 1879, and the land was offered for sale.

Father McNally died on November 6, 1889, after suffering a stroke. He was succeeded by Father John Gloyd, formerly of St. John's Catholic Church in Westminster, Maryland, on November 24, 1889. Father Gloyd oversaw the burial of Father McNally at Mount Olivet Cemetery (where his remains had been temporarily interred in the receiving vault).

Father Gloyd's tenure was relatively short, compared to the 22-year term of Father McNally. Father McNally's advanced age left him somewhat unable to attend to the church's finances as well as he might have, and St. Stephe Martyr had incurred a significant amount of debt. Father Gloyd worked diligently to improve the church's income, and paid off the debt. During this time, he also conducted a campaign to collect old gold and silver jewelry from parishioners, which was then melted down and turned into a solid gold chalice and a solid silver gold-plated chalice. He also undertook repairs and made general improvements to the church and rectory. In April 1894, Father Jacob Walter at nearby St. Patrick's Catholic Church died, and James Gibbons, Archbishop of Baltimore, assigned Father Gloyd as his successor. The Rev. John J. Dougherty of St. Edward's Catholic Church in Calverton, Maryland, succeeded Gloyd on May 14, 1894.

Father Dougherty's time at Saint Stephen Martyr was even shorter than Father Gloyd's, yet he significantly expanded the church. In October 1894, the congregation celebrated the installation of a large new marble altar, a gift provided by Father Gloyd and John G. Schwind of Baltimore. Major architectural changes were made to the church as well. In August 1895, a $5,000 ($193,500 in 2025 dollars) renovation was made to the church. The two sacristy rooms on the south side of the sanctuary were demolished and two new chapels built there. Each chapel had a decorative stone arch over its entrance, and two windows (set aside for stained glass memorials to parishioners) which provided natural lighting. A small marble altar, carved by local D.C. artists, was added to each chapel as well. The north wall of the sanctuary was also removed, and the sanctuary extended with an apse. New sacristy rooms were placed on either side of the reinstalled large altar, and a decorative stone arch added to distinguish the apse from the sanctuary. The floor of the sanctuary was also tiled in what The Evening Star newspaper called a "graceful pattern". The renovation took three months, during which time the congregation worshipped in the church basement. Saint Stephen Martyr's renovated sanctuary reopened on October 27, 1895, with the Rev. Dr. D.J. Stafford of St. Patrick's Church preaching the sermon.

Father Dougherty fell seriously ill with an unspecified throat infection in September 1895. By April, his illness was so severe that Cardinal Gibbons traveled from Baltimore to visit. His health significantly improved by early May, and he returned to his parish on June 5. But Dougherty suffered several unspecified severe illnesses throughout the summer, and on September 18, 1896, he suddenly resigned his position. Father Walker S. Caughy, pastor at St. Mary's Catholic Church in Laurel, Maryland, succeeded him on September 27, 1896. Father Dougherty died of tuberculosis on November 28, 1896, in Cullman, Alabama, where he had gone to try to regain his health. He was just 43 years old.

== Retirement of debt and construction of a new parish school ==
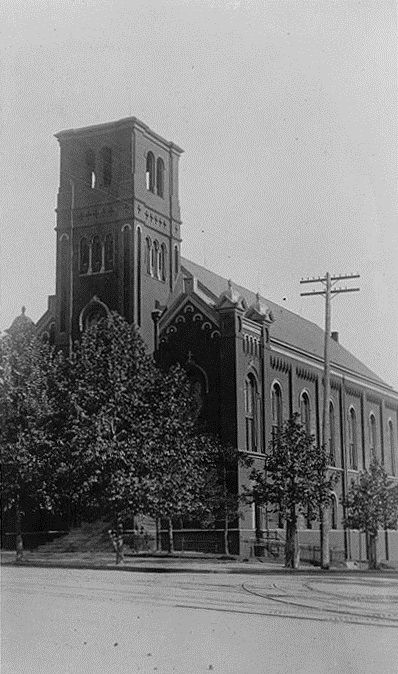
Saint Stephen Martyr Catholic Church between 1909 and 1919.

Father Caughy became one of the best-known clergy in the District of Columbia during his tenure at Saint Stephen Martyr. He was admired for his broad-mindedness, compassion, and good humor, and he was widely considered to be a theologian of an exceptionally high caliber. He became close friends with Cardinal Gibbons, who ordained him in 1880. He found Saint Stephen Martyr $28,550 in debt ($1,104,885 in 2025 dollars), and managed to reduce this debt by half during his time as pastor. Caughy fell seriously ill with influenza in mid-December 1909, but continued to work through the Christmas holiday. He suffered a severe nervous breakdown in January 1910, and entered St. Agnes Hospital in Baltimore. But he died there suddenly of unspecified causes on February 2. A Pontifical High Mass of Requiem was said by Owen Patrick Bernard Corrigan, auxiliary bishop of Baltimore. The Rev. Dr. William Aloysius Fletcher, rector of the Basilica of the Assumption of the Blessed Virgin Mary in Baltimore, preached the sermon. A Month's Mind requiem mass was said by Monsignor James Mackin of St. Paul's Catholic Church of Baltimore on March 3. In a sign of the high esteem in which Father Caughy was held, Cardinal Gibbons preached the sermon and delivered the absolution.

Father Joseph J. Cassidy of St. John's Catholic Church in Westminster, Maryland, was named Caughy's successor on February 18, 1910. He took up his position on March 29. With Saint Stephen Martyr still $13,800 in debt ($476,839 in 2025 dollars), he used fairs to help retire the debt as swiftly as possible. Father Cassidy also undertook major renovations to the church, installing electric lighting and having new frescos painted throughout the interior. The cost of the improvements, which began in early summer 1915 and were complete by mid-September, was $5,450 ($173,450 in 2025 dollars). To celebrate the refurbishment, a solemn high mass, presided over by Cardinal Gibbons, was said on September 26, 1915 (the day the sanctuary reopened). The mass was celebrated by Monsignor William T. Russell of St. Patrick's Catholic Church, and the sermon preached by the Right Reverend Charles Warren Currier, Bishop of Matanzas, Cuba.

Father Cassidy had two goals he wished to accomplish at Saint Stephen Martyr: The addition of a parochial school and the founding of a convent. Fundraising for the school occurred during World War I, and it was not until September 1923 that ground was broken for the school. Designed by the local architectural firm of Pierson & Wilson and built by the Schneider-Spleidt Co. of D.C., the limestone and red brick building had eight classrooms, cloakrooms, and an assembly hall with balcony which sat 600. The basement contained separate boys' and girls' recreation rooms and a social hall. The estimated cost was $165,000 ($3,117,920 in 2025 dollars). Father Cassidy was made a monsignor by Pope Pius XI on September 8, 1924, for having rendered valuable service to the Catholic Church. He was honored again by Pope Pius by being named a domestic prelate of the papal household on November 23, 1924. He was invested with the honor at a ceremony presided over by Michael Joseph Curley, Archbishop of Baltimore, on the same day that the new $200,000 ($3,757,282) St. Stephen's School opened.

Father Cassidy's health began to deteriorate, however. He suffered from obliterating endarteritis, which inflamed the inner lining of the arteries and blocked blood flow to his limbs and vital organs. His left leg was severely affected by the disease in September 1925, and dry gangrene set in. This leg was amputated above the knee at Georgetown University Hospital on October 13, 1925. His parishioners purchased an automobile for his use in visiting members of the congregation, and he used an artificial limb for walking. Monsignor Cassidy's health appeared excellent after the amputation. But in late August 1925, he fell seriously ill with stomach cancer, and died suddenly at Georgetown University Hospital on September 26, 1925, at the age of 69. Archbishop Curley presided over his requiem mass, which was said by Monsignor C.F. Thomas of St. Patrick's Catholic Church. Called a "priest's priest" by Archbishop Curley, more than 40 local priests attended his funeral. Father Cassidy's vision of a convent, however, remained unfulfilled at the time of his death.

Father Vincent Fitzgerald, assistant rector at Saint Stephen Martyr, led the congregation for 10 months as interim pastor. He purchased the House of Mercy at 2048 K Street NW, (Note: The House of Mercy was founded by the Association for Works of Mercy, a group of Episcopal Church. It was run by the Community of St. Mary, an Anglican religious order of nuns.) and at a cost of $25,000 ($463,362) renovated the structure along with the St. Stephen's School temporary school building into a convent. The Sisters of Notre Dame de Namur moved into the convent on April 19, 1927, and took up teaching duties at the new parochial school.

Father George B. Harrington of St. Mary's Catholic Church in Hagerstown, Maryland, succeeded Msgr. Cassidy. The church was $104,000 ($1,927,586 in 2025 dollars) in debt, and Father Harrington worked for most of the following decade to retire the debt.

== Mid-20th century ==
Father Harrington was highly regarded by the archdiocese for his administrative capabilities. He fell ill in early December 1941, and died at the rectory of an unspecified illness on January 7, 1942. The assistant pastor, the Rev. Niles T. Welch, led Saint Stephen Martyr while the search for a permanent successor went on. During his three months as pastor, he had the interior of the convent finished with new plaster walls and flooring.

Father Edward Jerome Winter was appointed pastor at Saint Stephen Martyr on May 28, 1942. Father Winter was formerly an assistant priest at the Shrine of the Sacred Heart in the Mount Pleasant/Columbia Heights neighborhoods of Washington, D.C., but most recently had been pastor at St. Joseph's Catholic Church in the small village of Texas, Maryland (now part of Cockeysville, Maryland). Father Winter confronted many challenges during his tenure at the church, most seriously a significant loss of members (a problem affecting all Catholic churches throughout the city). But his vibrant personality and homey sermons made him a favorite among his parishioners, who donated more heavily to the church at his behest. These increased tithes, coupled with Winter's solid financial management, led the church's income to rise by 307 percent between 1942 and 1949. In the fall of 1948, Father Winter undertook yet another renovation of the church. The sanctuary in the basement had long been neglected. He had the upper portion of the marble altar there removed and a semicircular church tabernacle carved to stand on the base of the old altar. He reused the upper altar marble to make statue pedestals for the sanctuary on the ground floor, and placed statues of the Blessed Virgin and Saint Joseph there on either side of the altar. He also purchased canopies (or "baldachins") for placement over each statue and the main altar, and refinished the floor of the basement sanctuary.

On May 19, 1949, Father Winter was transferred to the Shrine of the Sacred Heart, where he replaced the Right Rev. James A. Smyth, who had recently died. Father Joseph F. Denges, pastor at the Church of the Holy Ghost in Issue, Maryland, replaced Father Winter at Saint Stephen Martyr.

== Construction of modern structure ==
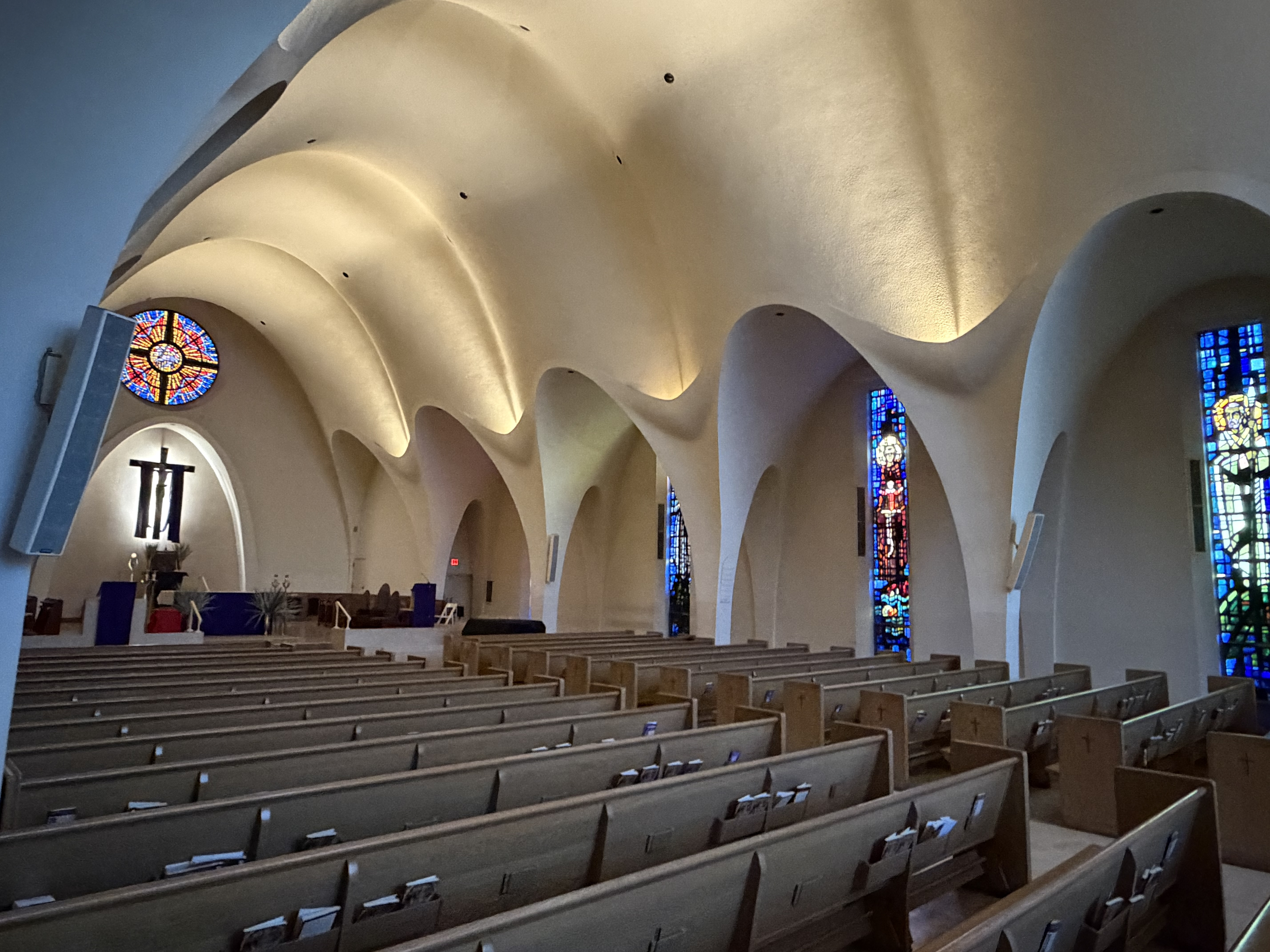
The nave and altar of St. Stephen Martyr Catholic Church

=== Early work of Monsignor Denges ===
Father Denges was named head of the 1954 and 1956 war victims' fund-raising drive for the Roman Catholic Archdiocese of Washington which had been formed in 1947. He was named a domestic prelate of the papal household in February 1956.

A plan was made to repair St. Stephen's School and the Sisters of Notre Dame de Namur convent. But enrolment at the school was rapidly declining, and the cost of upgrading the school to meet modern accreditation standards was unaffordable; the school closed in May 1954, and the building was purchased by the Daughters of Charity of Saint Vincent de Paul. Immaculate Conception Academy, a Catholic school for girls administered by the Daughters of Charity, began operating in the building in the fall of 1954. (Note: The Archdiocese of Washington sold the school for $2.1 million ($6,788,339 in 2025 dollars) in December 1984. The school closed suddenly on January 6, 1984, and the building was razed a few days later. A Doubletree Guest Suites was constructed on the site.)

In the late spring of 1959 part of the ceiling collapsed after a load-bearing pillar failed. Plans were proposed to reinforce the building and make it safe, but architects determined that repairs would only temporarily abate the problems. With membership in Saint Stephen's parish having grown significantly to 2,500 members, the decision was made in July to replace the worn brick church with a modern structure.

=== The new Saint Stephen Martyr Church ===
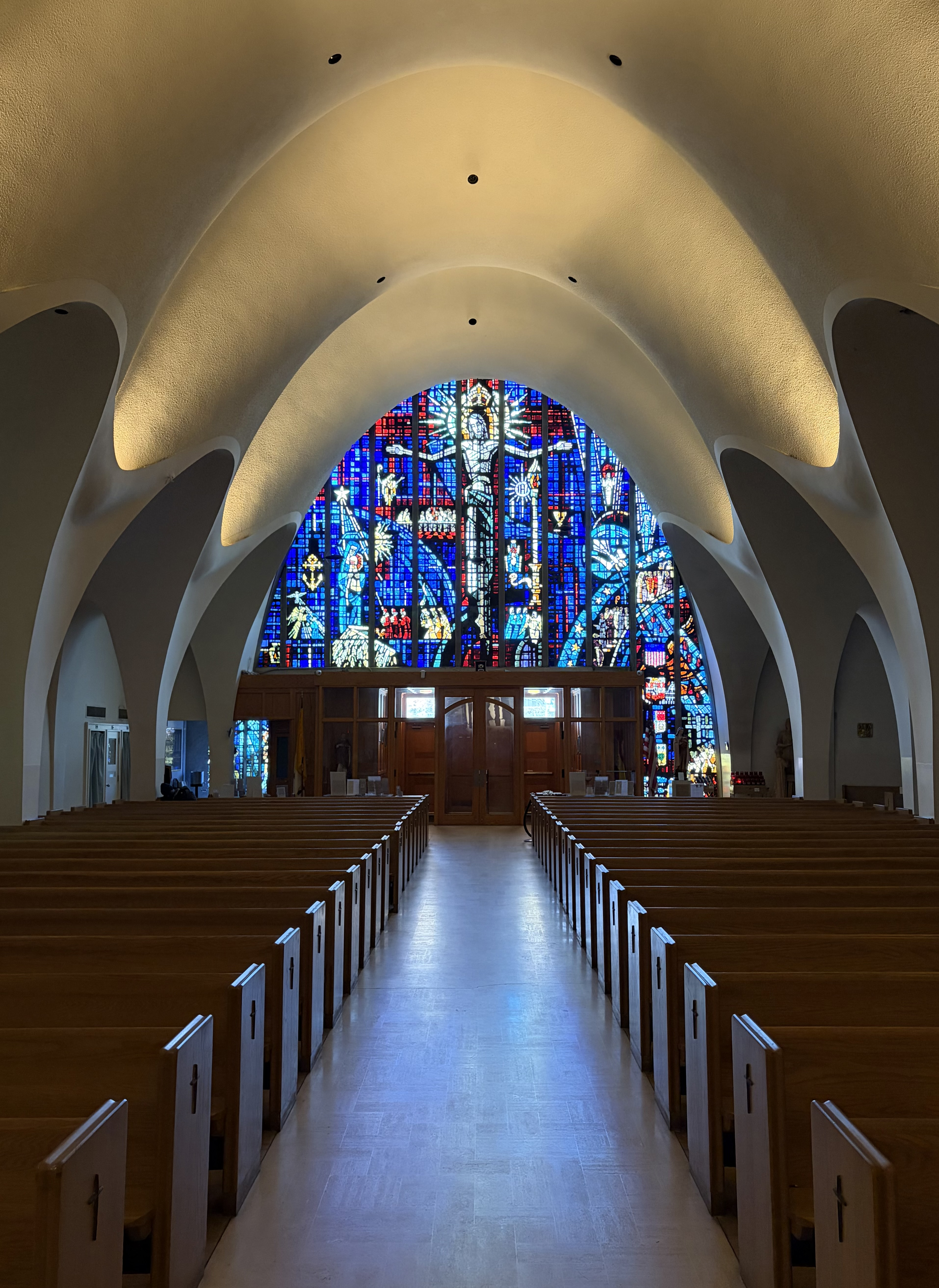
The parabolic vaults and chipped glass north window in the nave

The architectural firm of Johnson & Boutin designed a new brick and stone building. After mass in the old church on July 15, 1959, services were held at Immaculate Conception Academy.

The old church was razed some time after July 15, and the groundbreaking for the new Modernist-style structure was held November 8. The new church was consecrated on June 11, 1961, by Patrick O'Boyle, Archbishop of Washington. Denges celebrated the Mass, and John P. McCormick, rector of Theological College at The Catholic University of America, preached. The new building cost $650,000 ($7,003,062 in 2025 dollars). The front of the building had a freestanding, 70-foot (21 m) high star-shaped concrete bell tower, topped by a 20-foot (6.1 m) high gold enameled cross. A large 35-foot (11 m) high window made of chipped glass, manufactured in Chartres, France, faced Pennsylvania Avenue. The sanctuary of the church sat 700, while the parish hall in the basement held 300. The façade of the church has a 10-foot tall porcelain statue of Saint Stephen by Felix de Weldon, designed in 1960 and installed and dedicated in 1961.

The Washington Post architectural critic Benjamin Forgey called the church "semi-heroic", its chipped glass window "exceptional", and called particular attention to "the sanctuary formed with a succession of fluid parabolic vaults". "This is a modest achievement of another sort entirely", he wrote, "that is, it's a local variant of international architectural currents of the post-World War II era. It's a minor piece, to be sure, taking a little of this and that from here and there—the engineering expressionism of Pier Luigi Nervi and others, the 'brutalism' of late Le Corbusier, the simple asymmetries of 1950s commercial modernism. But in its way, at this particular location, it's a fine building."

== Assassination of President Kennedy ==
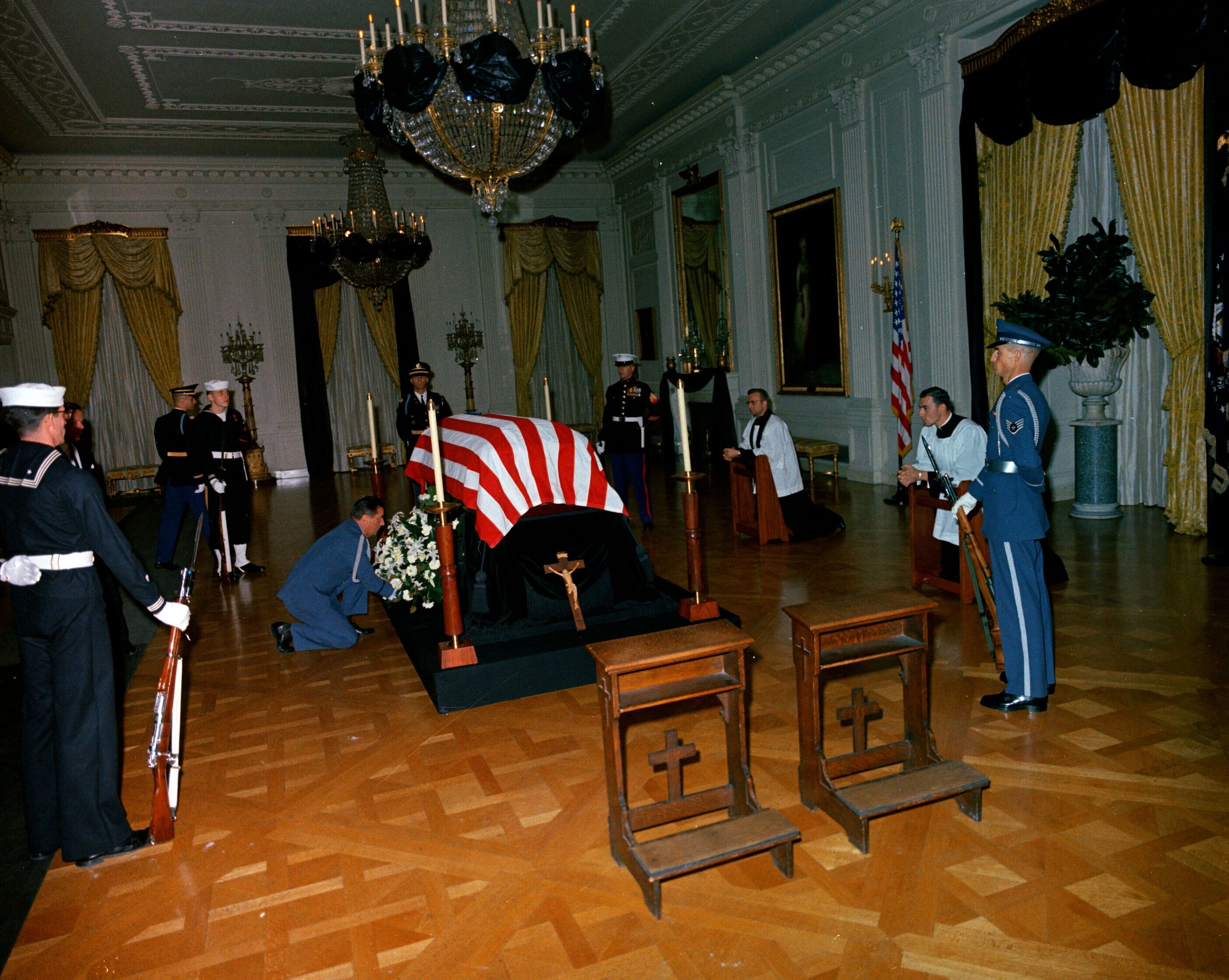
The four wooden candlesticks lent by Saint Stephen Martyr Church to the White House for the lying in repose of President Kennedy.

President John F. Kennedy and First Lady Jacqueline Kennedy often worshipped at Saint Stephen Martyr because the United States Secret Service believed it to be safer and more secure than other Catholic churches in the area. The Kennedys used the seventh pew on the right, from the back.

Because the church played an important part in the spiritual life of the Kennedys, Saint Stephen Martyr Church had a role in the President's lying in repose in the East Room of the White House on November 23 and 24, 1963. President Kennedy was assassinated in Dallas, Texas, at 12:30 p.m. Central Standard Time on November 22. When Monsignor Denges heard the news over the radio shortly after the assassination, he began tolling the church's bells—making Saint Stephen Martyr one of the first churches in the city to do so. At the request of church members and the public, Father P.L. Duffy, assistant pastor at Saint Stephen Martyr, led a service of Bible readings at 4 p.m. Monsignor Denges announced that a regularly scheduled mass, set for 6:30 that evening, would be offered for the repose of the President's soul. Word of mouth and an announcement on radio station WMAL spread the word about the mass, which drew about 400 people. It was the first mass said at Saint Stephen Martyr in which the celebrant priest (in this case, Msgr. Denges) faced the congregation.

As the afternoon and evening wore on, White House officials asked Monsignor John K. Cartwright, pastor at the Cathedral of St. Matthew the Apostle, to provide priests who could stand by at the Executive Residence to assist the First Family and White House staff, and to pray for the President. Father Duffy was one of the first priests in the city to report to the White House, arriving at 7 p.m. Monsignor Denges and Father Warren Kulas, a Benedictine student priest at George Washington University who was in residence at Saint Stephen Martyr, reported to the White House at 10 p.m. Father John Wintermyer, another assistant pastor at Saint Stephen Martyr, reported to the White House at 5 a.m. on November 23. He learned that President Kennedy's body had arrived 30 minutes earlier, and he prayed in the East Room until his shift ended at 6:00 AM.

At 10:30 p.m. on November 22, Ralph A. Dungan, special assistant to the President, telephoned Saint Stephen Martyr Church and asked to borrow items from the church for the lying-in-repose. Father Wintermyer approved the loan of four large wooden candlesticks, which were placed at the four corners of Kennedy's coffin while he lay in the East Room. Two prie-dieux (wooden desks at which people could kneel and pray) were also loaned to the White House and used by priests who prayed during the vigil. In January 1964, the White House contributed six small bronze plaques to affix to the items in commemoration of their role in President Kennedy's state funeral. On February 2, 1964, the Catholic War Veterans of the District of Columbia unveiled a bronze plaque affixed to the pew President Kennedy used when attending services at Saint Stephen Martyr.

== 1965–1999 ==
=== Pastoral turnover ===
The parish of Saint Stephen Martyr celebrated its 100th anniversary in 1967. Monsignor Denges retired on May 2, 1968—his 70th birthday.

Saint Stephen Martyr Catholic Church suffered heavy turnover among its pastors over the next several years. Father Edward J. O'Brien, Denges' successor, resigned due to ill health in November 1970 after just two and a half years as pastor. Auxiliary Bishop John Selby Spence (pastor at Shrine of the Sacred Heart) was appointed his successor immediately. But Bishop Spence also fell seriously ill, and was transferred to Carroll Manor (a nursing home) in late May 1972. The Rev. Michael J. Farrell, pastor at Holy Redeemer Catholic Church in College Park, Maryland, was named his successor at Saint Stephen Martyr. (Note: Bishop Spence died on March 7, 1973, after a long and unspecified illness. He was just 63 years old.) His successor was Father Thomas Sheehan, an Irish priest who had long served at St. Mary of the Mills Catholic Church in Laurel, Maryland (and briefly as an administrator at Saint Martin of Tours Catholic Church in D.C.)

Father Sheehan's appointment as pastor ended the rapid turnover of priests at Saint Stephen Martyr. He did not retire until May 1997.

=== New rectory and church refurbishment ===
Father Sheehan was well-read, had a gift for preaching, and had a warm and friendly personality which endeared him to his congregation and people in the neighborhood. He also led the fund-raising campaign to build a new rectory at Saint Stephen Martyr. The new rectory building was completed and dedicated by Father Sheehan in 1993. The Cluss rectory, much altered since its initial construction, was razed and the new rectory designed by the D.C. architectural firm of Smith Blackburn Stauffer Architects. The basement contained offices, community rooms, and a gallery with a skylight. The ground floor housed more offices, a reception area, a private lobby, and a parlor. The second and third floors contained a kitchen, communal dining room, and apartments for the parish priest and his assistants. The building was constructed around a three-story courtyard. The main entrance was situated off from the center of the rectory, with balconies above it on the floors above.

Sheehan's successor was Monsignor Kenneth W. Roeltgen, formerly the rector of Mount St. Mary's Seminary in Emmitsburg, Maryland. He had won a national reputation for recruiting men for the priesthood, and had revolutionized testing and screening for priestly applicants. His peers called him a "priest's priest", and his congregation and friends found him charismatic, compassionate, and full of good humor. He was well known for his attention to detail, which served him well when he undertook a $250,000 ($483,170 in 2025 dollars) fund-raising campaign to beautify the church. The effort added a new stained glass window to the sanctuary and relocated the altar closer to the congregation. Monsignor Roeltgen also deepened and expanded the church's relationship with the Catholic community at George Washington University, whose campus bordered the parish. Monsignor Roeltgen fell ill with cancer in 1995, but appeared to make a full recovery.

== Twenty-first century ==
In January 2002, Archbishop James Aloysius Hickey assigned Roeltgen to the pastorate at the Church of the Annunciation in Washington, D.C. He was preparing to leave Saint Stephen Martyr when his cancer returned in March. He died April 7, 2002, at Sibley Memorial Hospital.

Father R. Cary Hill was named Monsignor Roeltgen's successor at Saint Stephen Martyr. Previously having served as a parish priest and university chaplain, Father Hill had spent several years serving the archdiocese, most recently as Secretary for Clergy since 2000. In July 2004, he received the title Chaplain of His Holiness from Pope John Paul II.

Monsignor Hill left Saint Stephen Martyr in July 2005 to take up a position as pastor of Holy Cross Catholic Church in Garrett Park, Maryland. He was succeeded by Monsignor Edward Filardi, who at the time was serving both as priest-secretary to Cardinal Theodore E. McCarrick and as assistant director of priest vocations for the Archdiocese of Washington. Under Monsignor Filardi, Saint Stephen Martyr began preparations to celebrate the 50th anniversary of its new church building. Monsignor Filardi's tenure at Saint Stephen Martyr was short, and he was transferred to the pastorate of Our Lady of Lourdes Parish in Bethesda, Maryland, in June 2009.

Monsignor Paul Langsfeld became pastor at Saint Stephen Martyr as Monsignor Filardi's successor in January 2010, and he helped complete plans for the church building's 50th anniversary. Monsignor Langsfeld was previously Vice Rector at Mount St. Mary's Seminary, and later the Rector of the Pontifical College Josephinum in Columbus, Ohio. The centerpiece of the celebrations was the installation of new bronze and oak main doors to the church. Designed by Anthony Visco, an artist and sculptor in Philadelphia specializing in religious art, the doors were blessed on November 20, 2011, during their installation by Auxiliary Bishop Barry Knestout. The doors themselves are of oak, with three bronze panels. The central, largest panel features the stoning of St. Stephen. One side panel illustrates St. Stephen's ordination as a deacon, while the other depicts the conversion of St. Paul (who led the crowd in stoning Stephen).

Monsignor Langsfeld spent just two and a half years at Saint Stephen Martyr before being called to the pastorate at St. Rose of Lima Catholic Church in Gaithersburg, Maryland. Monsignor Robert Panke was appointed the temporary administrator of the church in June 2009, while continuing to serve as archdiocesan Director of Priest Vocations and Formation.

In October 2013, Monsignor Paul M. Dudziak, former pastor at St. Rose of Lima Catholic Church, became parish priest at Saint Stephen Martyr.

== Bibliography ==
- Commissioner of Education (1876). Report of the Commissioner of Education Made to the Secretary of the Interior for the Year 1875. Washington, D.C.: Government Printing Office.
- Commissioners of the District of Columbia (1894). Annual Report of the Commissioners of the District of Columbia for the Year Ending June 30, 1894. Washington, D.C.: Government Printing Office.
- Cox, Christina (2015). Catholics in Washington, D.C. Charleston, S.C.: Arcadia Publishing. ISBN 9781467120807.
- Langley, Harold D. (1968). St. Stephen Martyr Church and the Community, 1867-1967. Washington, D.C.: St. Stephen's Centennial Committee.
- Manchester, William (1967). The Death of a President, November 20-November 25, 1963. New York: Harper & Row.
- Riordan, Michael J.; Duffy, P.L.; Magri, F. Joseph; Weber, Edward E.; O'Hara, Arthur J.; McSweeny, James L.; Veale, James; Clavreul, Henry P.; Hintemeyer, Felix; Smith, John Talbot; Donahue, Thomas A.; Meehan, Thomas F.; Gabriels, Henry (1914). The Catholic Church in the United States of America, Undertaken to Celebrate the Golden Jubilee of His Holiness, Pope Pius X. Volume 3: The Province of Baltimore and the Province of New York, Section 1. New York: The Catholic Editing Co.
