= St. Philip the Apostle Catholic School =

Location
- 5414 Henderson Way; Camp Springs, Maryland 20746; United States
- 38°49′20″N 76°54′48″W

Information
- Type: private
- Motto: More Than An Education.... Lessons That Last A Lifetime
- Denomination: Roman Catholic
- Established: 1960
- Status: closed
- Closed: 2025
- Oversight: Archdiocese of Washington
- Principal: Ms. Deanna Johnson
- Grades: PK–8
- Colors: Red and White
- Mascot: Bulldog
- Team name: Bulldogs
- Website: stpamd.org

St. Philip the Apostle Catholic School, Camp Springs, Maryland, (known as St. Philips) was a Catholic school in Camp Springs, Maryland within the Archdiocese of Washington. It was the parish school of St. Philip the Apostle Catholic Church.

On June 27, 2025, the pastor of St. Philip the Apostle Parish announced that the school would not reopen due to declining enrollment.

== Description ==
The school was located at 5414 Henderson Way, Camp Springs, MD 20746. The school was part of the St. Philips Parish. The school taught classes from pre-kindergarten to grade 8.

== History ==
The school held its first classes in September 1960, with ninety (90) first and second grade students. By 1962, they were teaching classes from 1st through 6th grades; and, by 1964, they had added 7th and 8th grades. In 1986, kindergarten classes were added. In 1997, pre-K for four-year-olds was added; and, in 2007, pre-K for three-year olds was offered.

== Athletics ==
The school's track & field team placed 3rd in the CYO track and field championship behind Saint Ambrose Catholic School and Holy Family School in 2012. Their Boys Varsity Basketball team placed 5th in the CYO Division A. The Varsity Soccer teams had an undefeated season in 2010, but however they have been going downhill since, with a 5–5 record in 2011 and a 0–10 record in 2012.
