= List of high schools in Washington, D.C. =

This is a list of high schools in Washington, D.C.

== High schools ==
School name	Type	Grades	Neighborhood	Ward	DCPS school code	Address	Website
Anacostia High School	Public, traditional	9-12	Anacostia	8	450	1601 16th St SE, Washington, DC 20020	https://www.anacostiahs.org/
Ballou High School	Public, traditional	9-12	Congress Heights	8	452	3401 4th St SE, Washington, DC 20032	http://balloudc.com/
Calvin Coolidge High School	Public, traditional	9-12	Takoma	4	455	6315 5th St NW, Washington, DC 20011	https://www.coolidgeshs.org/
Cardozo Education Campus	Public, traditional	6-12	Columbia Heights	1	442	1200 Clifton St NW, Washington, DC 20009	http://www.cardozoec.org/
Dunbar High School	Public, traditional	9-12	Truxton Circle	5	467	101 N St NW, Washington, DC 20001	https://www.dunbarhsdc.org/
Eastern High School	Public, traditional	9-12	Kingman Park	7	457	1700 East Capitol St NE, Washington, DC 20002	https://www.easternhighschooldcps.org/
H.D. Woodson Senior High School	Public, traditional	9-12	Northeast Boundary	7	464	540 55th St NE, Washington, DC 20019	https://hdwoodson.org/
MacArthur Blvd High School	Public, traditional	9-10	Foxhall Village	3		4530 MacArthur Blvd NW Washington, DC 20007	https://www.macarthurhighschooldc.org/
Theodore Roosevelt High School	Public, traditional	9-12	Petworth	4	459	4301 13th St NW, Washington, DC 20011	http://theodorerooseveltdc.org/
Jackson-Reed High School	Public, traditional	9-12	Tenleytown	3	463	3950 Chesapeake St NW, Washington, DC 20016	https://jacksonreedhs.org/
Benjamin Banneker Academic High School	Public, selective	9-12	Shaw	1	402	1600 9th St NW, Washington, DC 20001	http://www.benjaminbanneker.org/
Bell Multicultural High School	Public, selective	9-12	Columbia Heights	1		3105 16th St NW, Washington, DC 20010	https://checdc.org/bell-multicultural-high-school.html
Duke Ellington School of the Arts	Public, selective	9-12	Burleith	2	471	3500 R St NW, Washington, DC 20007	http://www.ellingtonschool.org/
McKinley Technology High School	Public, selective	9-12	Eckington	5	435	151 T St NE, Washington, DC 20002	http://www.mckinleytech.org/
Phelps Architecture, Construction and Engineering High School	Public, selective	9-12	Carver Langston	6	478	704 26th St NE, Washington, DC 20002	https://phelpshsdc.org/
School Without Walls High School	Public, selective	9-12	Foggy Bottom	2	466	2130 G St NW, Washington, DC 20037	https://www.swwhs.org/
YouthBuild Public Charter School	Private		Mount Pleasant	1		3220 16th St. NW Washington, DC 20010	https://www.youthbuildpcs.org/about-ybpcs
British International School of Washington	Private	PK-12	Georgetown	2		2001 Wisconsin Ave NW, Washington, DC 20007	https://www.nordangliaeducation.com/bisw-washington
Georgetown Visitation Preparatory School	Private, girls'	9-12	Georgetown	2		1524 35th St NW, Washington, DC 20007	http://www.visi.org/
BASIS Washington DC	Charter	5-12	Penn Quarter	3		410 8th St NW, Washington, DC 20004	https://enrollbasis.com/washington-dc/
Edmund Burke School	Private	6-12	Forest Hills	3		4101 Connecticut Ave NW, Washington, DC 20008	http://www.burkeschool.org/
The Field School	Private	6-12	Foxhall Crescent	3		2301 Foxhall Rd NW, Washington, DC 20007	https://www.fieldschool.org/
Lab School of Washington	Private	1-12	Foxhall Village	3		4759 Reservoir Rd NW, Washington, DC 20007	http://www.labschool.org/
Maret School	Private	K-12	Cleveland Park	3		3000 Cathedral Ave NW, Washington, DC 20008	https://www.maret.org/
National Cathedral School	Private, girls'	4-12	McLean Gardens	3		3612 Woodley Rd NW, Washington, DC 20016	http://ncs.cathedral.org/
Russian Embassy School in Washington, D.C.	Private		Massachusetts Avenue Heights	3		2650 Wisconsin Ave NW, Washington, DC 20007	http://resw.us/
St. Albans School	Private	4-12	Massachusetts Avenue Heights	3		3001 Wisconsin Ave NW, Washington, DC 20016	https://www.stalbansschool.org/
St. John's College High School	Private	9-12	Chevy Chase	3		2607 Military Rd NW, Washington, DC 20015	http://www.stjohnschs.org/
Sidwell Friends School	Private	PK–12	McLean Gardens	3		3825 Wisconsin Ave, Washington, DC 20016	http://sidwell.edu/
Washington International School	Private	PK-12	Cleveland Park	3		3100 Macomb St NW, Washington, DC 20008	https://www.wis.edu/
Georgetown Day School	Private	PK-12	Tenleytown	3		4200 Davenport St NW, Washington, DC 20016	http://www.gds.org/
Capital City Public Charter School	Charter	PK-12	Manor Park	4		100 Peabody St NW, Washington, DC 20011	https://www.ccpcs.org/
DC International School	Charter	6-12	Takoma	4		1400 Main Dr NW, Washington, DC 20012	http://www.dcinternationalschool.org/
Parkmont School	Private	6-12	16th Street Heights	4		4842 16th St NW, Washington, DC 20011	https://www.parkmont.org/
Washington Latin Public Charter School	Charter	5-12	Brightwood Park	4		5200 2nd St NW, Washington, DC 20011	http://www.latinpcs.org
Luke C. Moore Opportunity Academy	Private		Brookland	5		1001 Monroe St NE, Washington, DC 20017	https://www.lukecmoore.org/
Perry Street Prep	Private		Woodridge	5		1800 Perry St NE, Washington, DC 20018	https://www.pspdc.org/
St. Anselm's Abbey School	Private, boys'	6-12	Michigan Park	5		4501 South Dakota Ave NE, Washington, DC 20017	https://www.saintanselms.org/admissions/visiting-the-abbey
Gonzaga College High School	Private, boys'	9-12	Near Northeast	6		19 I St NW, Washington, DC 20001	http://www.gonzaga.org/
Archbishop Carroll High School	Private	9-12	Pleasant Hill	5		4300 Harewood Rd NE, Washington, DC 20017	http://www.archbishopcarroll.org/
KIPP DC College Preparatory	Charter	9-12	NoMa	6		1405 Brentwood Pkwy NE, Washington, DC 20002	http://www.kippdc.org/our-schools/kipp-dc-college-preparatory/
Richard Wright Public Charter School	Charter	8-12	Southwest Federal Center	6		475 School St SW, Washington, DC 20024	https://www.richardwrightpcs.org/
Cesar Chavez Public Charter Schools for Public Policy	Charter	9-12	Mayfair	7		3701 Hayes St NE, Washington, DC 20019	https://www.chavezschools.org/
IDEA Public Charter School	Charter		Deanwood	7		1027 45th St NE, Washington, DC 20019	http://ideapcs.org
Maya Angelou Public Charter School	Charter	9-12	Capitol View	7		5600 East Capitol St NE, Washington, DC 20019	http://www.seeforever.org/
Thurgood Marshall Academy	Charter	9-12	Barry Farm	8		2427 Martin Luther King Jr Ave SE, Washington, DC 20020	http://www.thurgoodmarshallacademy.org/
KIPP DC Legacy College Preparatory	Charter	9-12	Washington Highlands	8		3999 8th St SE, Washington, DC 20032	https://www.kippdc.org/schools/high-school/kipp-dc-legacy-college-prep/
Digital Pioneers Academy	Charter	8-10	Capitol Hill	6		709 12th St SE, Washington, DC 20003	https://www.digitalpioneersacademy.org/
E.L. Haynes Public Charter School	Charter	9-12	Petworth	4		4501 Kansas Ave NW, Washington, DC 20011	https://www.elhaynes.org/
Friendship Public Charter School - Collegiate Academy	Charter	9-12	Central Northeast	7		4095 Minnesota Ave NE, Washington, DC 20019	https://www.friendshipschools.org/schools/collegiate/
Friendship Public Charter School - Technology Preparatory Academy High	Charter	9-12	Congress Heights	8		2705 Martin Luther King Jr Ave SE, Washington, DC 20032	https://www.friendshipschools.org/schools/tech-prep-high/
Girls Global Academy Public Charter School	Charter, girls'	9-11	Penn Quarter	2		733 8th St NW, Washington, DC 20001	http://girlsglobalacademy.org/
Goodwill Excel Center Public Charter School	Charter	9-12	Foggy Bottom	2		1776 G St NW, Washington, DC 20006	http://goodwillexcelcenter.org/
Kingsman Academy Public Charter School	Charter	6-12	Kingman Park	6		1375 E St NE, Washington, DC 20002	https://www.kingsmanacademy.org/
Paul Public Charter School - International School	Charter	9-12	Brightwood	4		5800 8th St NW, Washington, DC 20011	http://www.paulcharter.org/
SEED Public Charter School	Charter	9-12	Fort Dupont	7		4300 C St SE, Washington, DC 20019	https://www.seedschooldc.org/
St. Coletta Special Education Public Charter School	Charter	PK-12	Hill East	7		1901 Independence Ave SE, Washington, DC 20003	https://www.stcoletta.org/
Washington Leadership Academy Public Charter School	Charter	9-12	Edgewood	5		3015 4th St NE, Washington, DC 20017	http://washingtonleadershipacademy.org/

St. Anselm's Abbey School 4501 South Dakota Ave NE, Washington, DC 20017

== Map of high schools ==
Blue = public, traditional | Yellow = public, selective | Green = charter | Orange = private

== Closed high schools ==
- Associates for Renewal in Education Public Charter School
- Emerson Preparatory School
- Jos-Arz Academy Public Charter
- Kamit Institute Public Charter
- Kingsbury Day School
- Margaret Murray Washington School
- Spingarn High School
- Washington Metropolitan High School

== Images ==
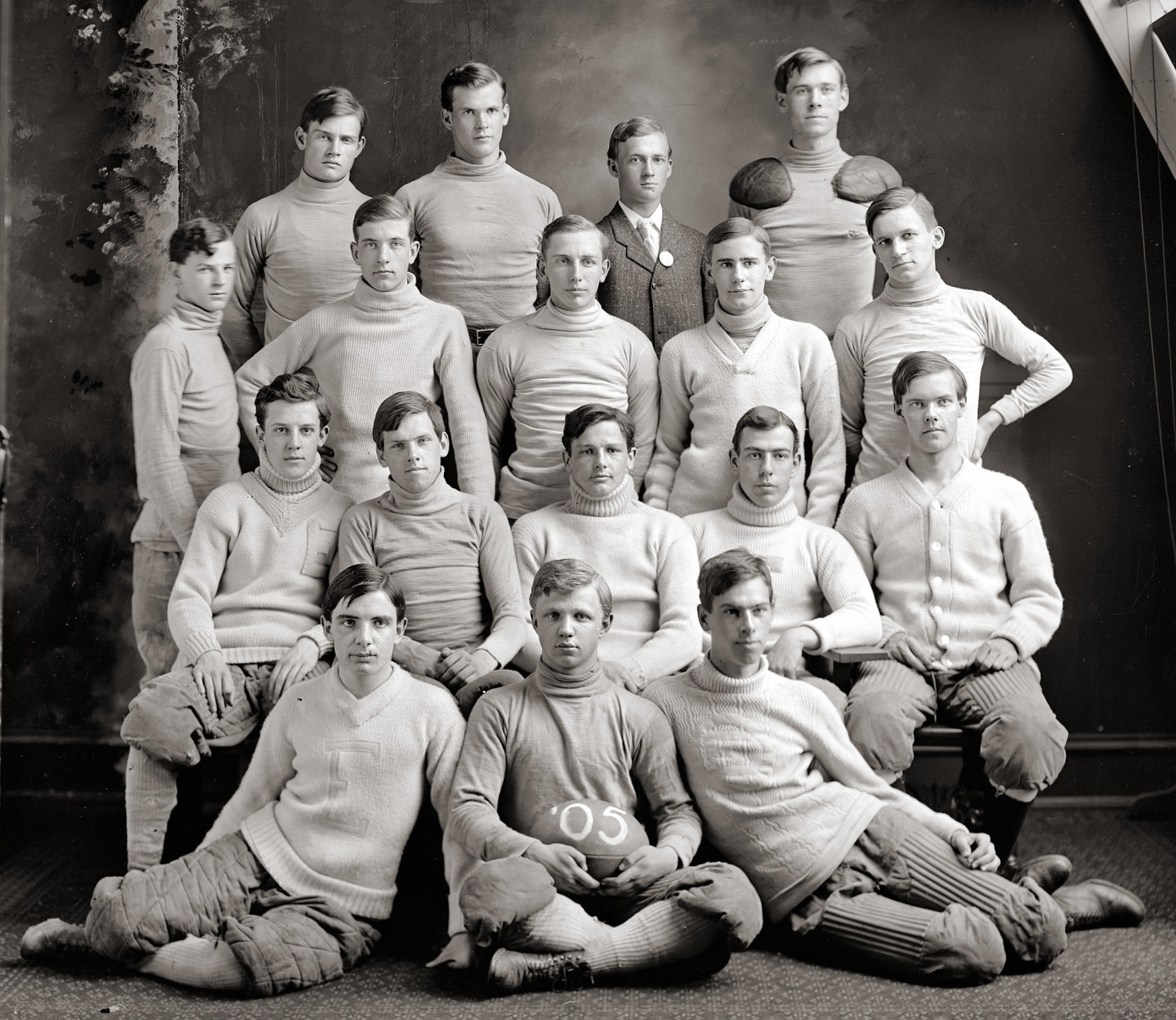
Eastern High School football team in 1905

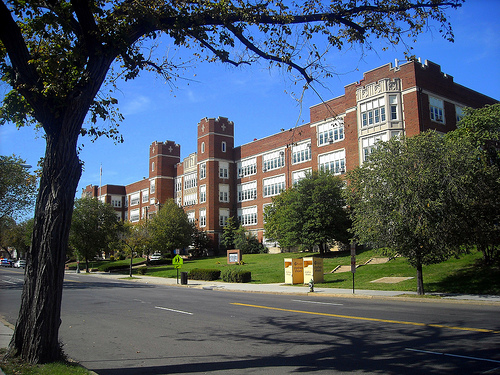
Eastern High School
