= Charles E. Smith Jewish Day School =

School in North Bethesda, Maryland, US

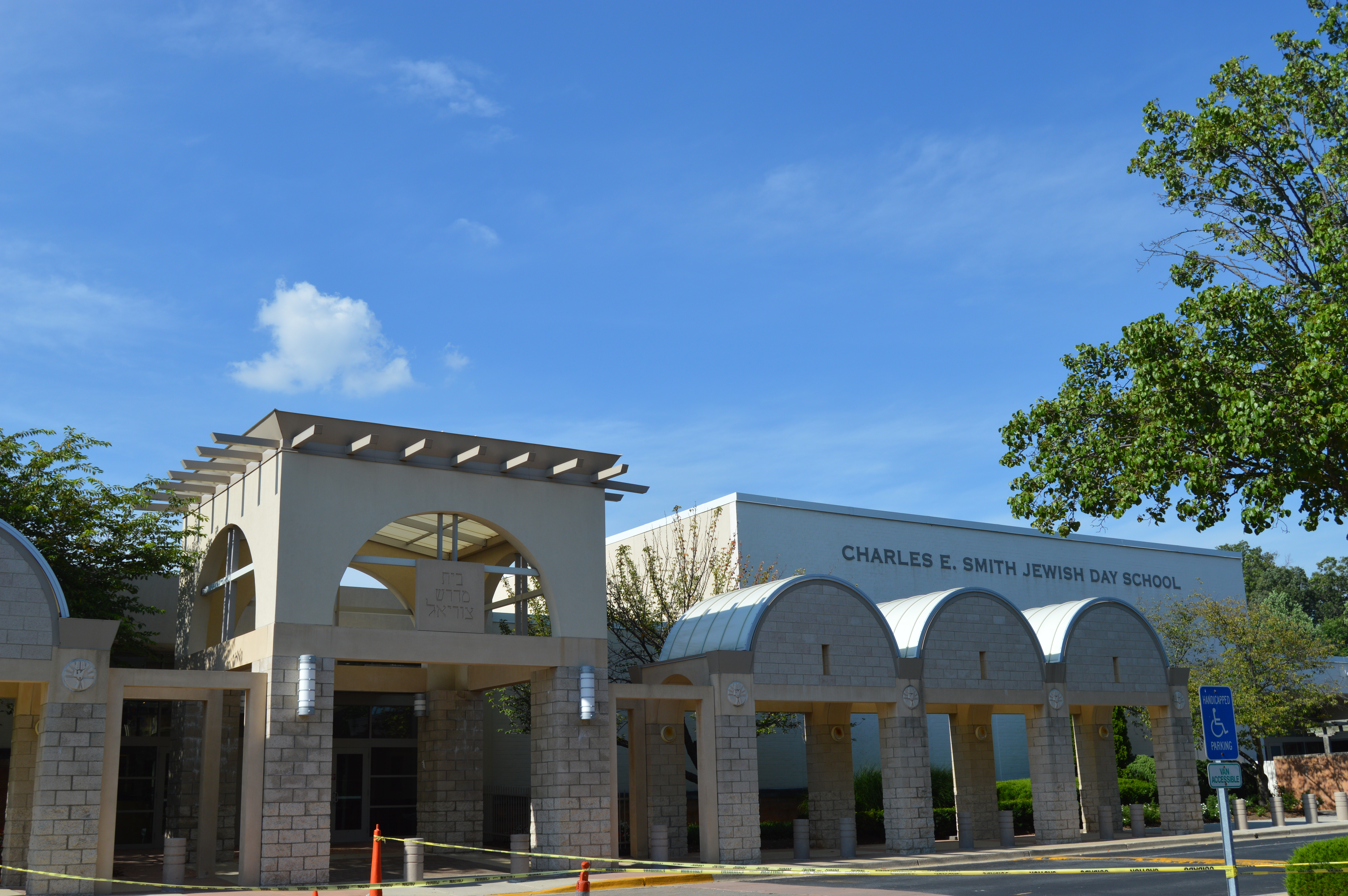
- Upper School

Location
- Upper School: 11710 Hunters Lane; North Bethesda, Maryland (Rockville address) 20852; United States Lower School: 1901 East Jefferson Street; Rockville, Maryland 20852; United States; 39°03′14″N 77°07′37″W

Information
- Type: Private, Jewish day school, College-prep
- Motto: "...You shall teach them diligently to your children" (Deuteronomy 6:7)
- Established: September 1965
- Head of school: Mitchel Malkus
- Faculty: 199
- Grades: Pre-kindergarten–twelfth grade
- Enrollment: 924 (2019-2020)
- Student to teacher ratio: 6:1
- Campus: Suburban
- Colors: Blue and gold
- Nickname: Lions
- Rival: Melvin J. Berman Hebrew Academy
- Newspaper: The Lion's Tale
- Yearbook: Dimensions
- Website: www.cesjds.org

The Charles E. Smith Jewish Day School, often referred to as CESJDS or JDS, is a private, pluralistic Jewish JK-12 school located on two campuses in North Bethesda (Rockville postal address), Maryland, United States. Founded in 1966, the school's namesake is Charles E. Smith, a local Jewish philanthropist and real estate magnate.

The head of school is Rabbi Mitchel Malkus.

== Campus ==
Two distinct campuses make up the school. The two campuses are distinct yet interrelated, and school functions take place regularly at both locations. The two campuses are located less than two miles from one another in Rockville, Maryland.

=== Lower school ===
The building has three levels. People regularly use the oval Beit Midrash, located at the entrance for tefillah. Other notable facilities include the Great Books Reading Room, "Field of Dreams" playground, technology labs, science classrooms, and a library with two designated working classrooms.

Since 1976, the Lower School has undergone three major renovations. The school now occupies approximately 130,000 square feet (12,000 m^{2}) on 11 acres (45,000 m^{2}) and houses over 700 Lower School students.

=== Upper school ===
The central hallway, the "Cardo", is bracketed by arches modeled on the archways in the ancient Jewish Quarter of Byzantine Jerusalem. The main thoroughfare showcases student art and other projects.

Throughout the structure are pieces of Jewish history and acknowledgments of the foundation of pluralism on which the school was established. The Beit Midrash features rounded stained glass windows circling a cupola based on Eastern European synagogue design, with each panel representing an essential principle of Judaism, including Torah, Neshamah (Soul), Kavanah (Spirit), Tikkun Olam (Repairing the World) and Rachamim (Compassion). A woodworking motif frames the room and Jerusalem stone is featured throughout. The doorposts in the school have distinct mezuzot.

Spaces for the arts and athletics include the Daniel Pearl Memorial Gym which holds 700 and encompasses full-court basketball and volleyball play. Art spaces include a ceramics studio with six pottery wheels and a state-of-the-art kiln, a professionally equipped photography studio, a dark room, and a recording studio.

== Early graduation ==
The Upper School curriculum is designed through a unique method whereby all high school seniors graduate after the fall semester, as opposed to continuing through the spring and graduating in May or June, as is the practice at most local schools. Students complete their high school studies in late January and graduate in early February, after which they are given the choice to go on a school-sponsored trip that mixes education and tourism. It combines a week of Jewish history in Europe with a three-month, whirlwind tour of Israel, hosted and led by the Alexander Muss High School in Israel.

== History ==
Solomon Schechter School of Greater Washington opened in September 1965. Operating under the auspices of United Synagogue of America, classes were held near Chevy Chase, Maryland. During the school's first year in operation, two teachers, Masha Spiegel and Masha Cohen, taught seven children in kindergarten and first grade. Gershon W. Gross became the school's administrator in 1967.

Throughout the school's history, it had operated in various rented spaces in Maryland, but it had long wanted a permanent location of its own. In 1971, the United Jewish Appeal asked the Greater Washington Jewish Community Foundation to raise funds to build a permanent location for the school. The Greater Washington Jewish Community Foundation searched for a site with about 10 acres (40,000 m^{2}) of land that was as close to Washington, D.C., as possible. In 1974, the Greater Washington Jewish Community Foundation took an option on a $500,000 property located on Montrose Road in Rockville. The Rockville property was adjacent to the new location of B'nai Israel Congregation, which had moved there in 1970.

A few months later, the Marjorie Webster School was put up for sale. The private Webster School's campus was located at 17th Street and Kalmia Road NW in the Washington, D.C. neighborhood of Colonial Village. An option was taken on the Webster School, but it was later determined that the Webster School would require a more costly renovation than was financially practical. The site selection committee decided to move forward with the Montrose Road site in Rockville. Some families were unhappy with that decision, as the majority of students lived closer to the Colonial Village site than to the Rockville site.

On April 24, 1977, the school dedicated its new 62,819-square-foot (5,840 m^{2}) building at 1901 E. Jefferson Street in Rockville. The $2.7-million building became the first permanent location for the school. The building is owned by the Greater Washington Jewish Community Foundation, and the school has a renewable 99-year lease. Charles E. Smith was the chairman of Greater Washington Jewish Community Foundation, and Smith had helped raise the funds to build the facility.

In 1980, the school was renamed in honor of Charles E. Smith, who had been a generous donor and fundraiser for the school.

The upper school was built in 1998, and the lower school was expanded in 2001.

In April 2006, three seniors who were participating in the school-sponsored program in Israel through the Alexander Muss High School were arrested by Israeli police for marijuana possession. The marijuana was discovered by program guides, and the quantity was judged to be large enough to necessitate involving governmental authorities, according to Muss headmaster Chaim Fischgrund. Drug experts cited in a Jewish Standard article theorized that the students had intended to sell the marijuana. These three students were expelled from the program, and six other students were expelled for having bought or used marijuana during the program. Local police arrested two students on drug charges, who were held overnight.

== Athletics ==
The Lions participate in athletics in the Potomac Valley Athletic Conference. Their biggest rival is the Melvin J. Berman Hebrew Academy Cougars. Led by head coach Jason Belinkie, the JDS track and field and cross country teams often rank among the top private schools in the state, winning seven Maryland Private School Cross Country State Championships in 2017, 2021, 2022, 2024, and 2025 (boys' and girls' teams). ESPN produced a SportsCenter feature on the JDS boys' cross country team, Running on Faith, which aired on April 9, 2023. The boys' varsity basketball team also won the 2017 PVAC Championship. The girls' varsity softball team won a championship in 2023. The boys' middle school baseball team won PVAC championships in 2017, 2018, and 2019. Below is a list of sports that the Lions participate in.

The cross-country teams schedule competition around Shabbat, when observant athletes do not use electronics or travel by car, and around Jewish holidays that restrict athletic activity. In 2024, both the boys' and girls' teams won their conference and Maryland private-school championships while observing those scheduling constraints.

Fall sports: Cross country; Golf; Boys' soccer; Girls' soccer; Girls' tennis; Girls' volleyball	Winter sports: Boys' basketball; Girls' basketball; Dance; Wrestling	Spring sports: Baseball; Softball; Tennis; Track and field; Volleyball

== Notable alumni ==
- Jeremy Bash, former chief of staff at the U.S. Department of Defense and the Central Intelligence Agency
- Michael Dunn, guard for NFL's Cleveland Browns
- Natalie Portman, actress
- Ari Shaffir, comedian and host of the Skeptic Tank podcast
- Abigail Shrier, author and former opinion columnist
- Rachel Simmons, author of Odd Girl Out
- Ethan Slater, actor
- Joe Vogel, Democratic member of the Maryland House of Delegates, representing District 17 since 2023
