= List of high schools in Washington =

List of high schools in Washington may refer to:

- List of high schools in Washington (state)
- List of high schools in Washington, D.C.
