= Potomac Valley Athletic Conference =

Formed in 1979, the Potomac Valley Athletic Conference is a group of independent schools in the Washington metropolitan area who compete against each other in interscholastic athletics. The conference comprises small independent schools from Maryland and the District of Columbia.

== Member schools ==
Full members

| School | Mascot | Location | Enrollment | Grades Served |
|---|---|---|---|---|
| Edmund Burke School | Bengals | Washington, D.C. | 300 | 6-12 |
| Charles E. Smith Jewish Day School | Lions | Rockville, Maryland | 950 | K-12 |
| Don Bosco Cristo Rey High School | Wolf Pack | Takoma Park, MD | 400 | 9-12 |
| The Field School | Falcons | Washington, D.C. | 360 | 6-12 |
| Kendall Demonstration School | Eagles | Washington, D.C. | 150 | PK-8 |
| Milton Gottesman Jewish Day School | Pandas | Washington, D.C. | 470 | PK-8 |
| Melvin J. Berman Hebrew Academy | Cougars | Rockville, Maryland | 700 | PK-12 |
| McLean School of Maryland | Mustangs | Potomac, Maryland | 350 | K-12 |
| Model Secondary School for the Deaf | Eagles | Washington, D.C. | 180 | 9-12 |
| Sandy Spring Friends School | Wildebeests | Sandy Spring, Maryland | 530 | PK-12 |
| Spencerville Adventist Academy | Hornets | Spencerville, Maryland | 360 | PK-12 |
| St. Anselm's Abbey School | Panthers | Washington, D.C. | 265 | 6-12 |
| Washington International School | Red Devils | Washington, D.C. | 900 | PK-12 |
| Washington Waldorf School | Red-Tailed Hawks | Bethesda, Maryland | 270 | PK-12 |

== Former members ==
- Barrie School
- Covenant Life School
- Georgetown Day School (1979-1998)
- Clinton Grace School (Formerly Grace Brethren Christian School) (?-2018)
- Montrose Christian School
- Queen Anne School (1979-2011)
- The Potomac School
- Oakcrest School (1979-2019)
- St. Andrew's Episcopal School (1979-1998)
- Washington Christian Academy

== PVAC champions ==
=== Boys soccer ===
Boys Soccer
| Year | Regular Season Champion | Tournament Champion | Tournament Runner-Up |
|---|---|---|---|
| 1986 | Edmund Burke School | Edmund Burke School | |
| 1987 | Georgetown Day School | Georgetown Day School | |
| 1988 | Georgetown Day School | Georgetown Day School | |
| 1989 | Georgetown Day School | Edmund Burke School | |
| 1990 | Georgetown Day School | Georgetown Day School | |
| 1991 | Georgetown Day School | Georgetown Day School | |
| 1992 | Georgetown Day School | Georgetown Day School | |
| 1993 | Georgetown Day School | Georgetown Day School | |
| 1994 | Georgetown Day School | Georgetown Day School | |
| 1995 | Georgetown Day School | Georgetown Day School | |
| 1996 | St. Andrew's Episcopal School | St. Andrew's Episcopal School | Edmund Burke School |
| 1997 | St. Andrew's Episcopal School | Georgetown Day School | St. Anselm's Abbey School |
| 1998 | Washington International School | Washington International School | Covenant Life School |
| 1999 | Sandy Spring Friends School | Sandy Spring Friends School | St. Anselm's Abbey School |
| 2000 | Sandy Spring Friends School | Grace Brethren Christian School | Sandy Spring Friends School |
| 2001 | Washington International School | Washington International School | Grace Brethren Christian School |
| 2002 | Sandy Spring Friends School* | Grace Brethren Christian School | Washington International School |
| 2003 | Washington International School | Washington International School | Grace Brethren Christian School |
| 2004 | Washington International School & St. Anselm's Abbey School | Sandy Spring Friends School | Washington International School |
| 2005 | Sandy Spring Friends School | Sandy Spring Friends School | St. Anselm's Abbey School |
| 2006 | Sandy Spring Friends School | Sandy Spring Friends School | Covenant Life School |
| 2007 | Washington International School & Charles E. Smith Jewish Day School | The Field School | Washington International School |
| 2008 | The Field School | Sandy Spring Friends School | Washington International School |
| 2009 | Washington International School | Washington International School | The Field School |
| 2010 | Sandy Spring Friends School | Washington International School | Sandy Spring Friends School |
| 2011 | Sandy Spring Friends School | Sandy Spring Friends School | Washington International School |
| 2012 | Washington International School | Washington International School | Sandy Spring Friends School |
| 2013 | Sandy Spring Friends School | Washington International School | Sandy Spring Friends School |
| 2014 | Washington International School | Sandy Spring Friends School | Washington International School |
| 2015 | Washington International School | Washington International School | Sandy Spring Friends School |
| 2016 | Washington International School | Washington International School | Sandy Spring Friends School |
| 2017 | Washington International School | Washington International School | Sandy Spring Friends School |
| 2018 | Washington International School | Washington International School | Sandy Spring Friends School |
| 2019 | Washington International School | Washington International School | Sandy Spring Friends School |
| 2021 | Washington International School | Washington International School | Sandy Spring Friends School |
| 2022 | Washington International School | Washington International School | Sandy Spring Friends School |
| 2023 | Washington International School | Washington International School | Sandy Spring Friends School |

*No regular season champion was declared in 2002 when the season was shortened due to the DC-area sniper incident. Sandy Spring Friends School finished in first place in the abbreviated regular season.

Champions
| School | Regular Season Championships | Tournament Championships | Total Banners |
|---|---|---|---|
| Washington International School | 16 | 15 | 30 |
| Georgetown Day School | 9 | 10 | 19 |
| Sandy Spring Friends School | 8 | 7 | 15 |
| St. Andrew's Episcopal School | 2 | 1 | 3 |
| Washington Christian Academy | 1 | 2 | 3 |
| Edmund Burke School | 1 | 1 | 2 |
| The Field School | 1 | 1 | 2 |
| St. Anselm's Abbey School | 1 | 0 | 1 |
| Charles E. Smith Jewish Day School | 1 | 0 | 1 |
| Grace Brethren | 0 | 2 | 2 |

=== Other sports ===
Boys varsity basketball

- 1998-St. Anselm's Abbey
- 1999-The Field School
- 2000-The Field School
- 2001-Berman Hebrew Academy
- 2002-Barrie School
- 2003-St. Anselm's Abbey
- 2004-Charles E. Smith Jewish Day School
- 2005-Berman Hebrew Academy
- 2006-Grace Brethren Christian School
- 2007-St. Anselm's Abbey
- 2008-The Field School
- 2009-Washington International School
- 2010-Covenant Life School
- 2011-Covenant Life School
- 2012-Grace Brethren Christian School
- 2013-McLean School
- 2014-Covenant Life School
- 2015-Grace Brethren Christian School
- 2016-Sandy Spring Friends School
- 2017-Charles E. Smith Jewish Day School
- 2018-Sandy Spring Friends School
- 2019-St. Anselm's Abbey
- 2020-McLean School
- 2022-Sandy Spring Friends School
- 2023-Sandy Spring Friends School
- 2024-Sandy Spring Friends School
- 2025-Berman Hebrew Academy
- 2026-Sandy Spring Friends School

Girls varsity volleyball

- 1998-Covenant Life
- 1999-Hebrew Academy
- 2000-Covenant Life
- 2001-Covenant Life
- 2002-Covenant Life
- 2003-Covenant Life
- 2004-Covenant Life
- 2005-Covenant Life
- 2006-Covenant Life
- 2007-Covenant Life
- 2008-Covenant Life
- 2009-Covenant Life
- 2010-Covenant Life
- 2011-Covenant Life
- 2012-Covenant Life
- 2013-Washington International School
- 2014-Washington International School
- 2015-Covenant Life
- 2016-Washington International School
- 2017-Washington International School

Boys varsity baseball

- 2002-Charles E. Smith Jewish Day School
- 2003-St. Anselm's Abbey
- 2004-St. Anselm's Abbey
- 2005-Charles E. Smith Jewish Day School
- 2006-St. Anselm's Abbey
- 2007-Charles E. Smith Jewish Day School
- 2008-St. Anselm's Abbey
- 2009-Charles E. Smith Jewish Day School
- 2010-St. Anselm's Abbey
- 2011-St. Anselm's Abbey
- 2012-Charles E. Smith Jewish Day School
- 2013-The Field School
- 2014-The Field School
- 2015-Sandy Spring Friends School
- 2016-Sandy Spring Friends School
- 2017-St. Anselm's Abbey
- 2018-St. Anselm's Abbey
- 2022-St. Anselm's Abbey
- 2023-Sandy Spring Friends School
- 2024-Washington Waldorf School
- 2025-Sandy Spring Friends School
- 2026-Charles E. Smith Jewish Day School

Boys varsity track

- 2006 - Grace Brethren
- 2007 - Grace Brethren
- 2008 - The Field School
- 2009 - Edmund Burke
- 2010 - St. Anselm's
- 2011 - St. Anselm's and The Field School tied
- 2012 - The Field School
- 2013 - The Field School
- 2014 - The Field School
- 2015 - The Field School
- 2016 - The Field School
- 2017 - The Field School
- 2018 - The Field School
- 2019 - Edmund Burke School

== College Athletics ==
Despite its low profile, the PVAC has sent athletes to many high-profile Division I schools such as UNC, University of Louisville, Davidson, Navy, Elon University, and Cornell University. Harvard University and Rutgers University. There are many PVAC graduates playing at Division III schools.
