= Thomas Verner Moore =

American psychologist and psychiatrist

- Born: October 22, 1877; Louisville, Kentucky
- Died: June 5, 1969 (aged 91); Burgos, Spain
- Education: Catholic University of America
- Known for: Symptom rating scales
- Scientific career
- Fields: Psychology; Psychiatry
- Workplaces: Catholic University of America
- Thesis: Reaction time and movement (1903)
- Doctoral advisor: Edward A. Pace
- Other academic advisors: Wilhelm Wundt

Dom Thomas Verner Moore (October 22, 1877 – June 5, 1969) was an American psychologist, psychiatrist and monk. He was the "first psychiatric researcher to create symptom rating scales and use factor analysis to deconstruct psychosis." He was also among the first Catholic priests to conduct influential scientific work in psychology, and he developed a psychiatric paradigm based on Catholic teaching, as well as on the philosophical perspective of Thomism.

== Early life ==
Moore was born on October 22, 1877, in Louisville, Kentucky. He was named after his grandfather, a Presbyterian minister who was once a Moderator of the General Assembly of the Presbyterian Church in the United States. In 1896, he entered the Paulist Fathers, and he was ordained as a member in 1901. In 1903, he earned his doctorate in psychology from the Catholic University of America under the supervision of Edward A. Pace. In 1904, he published his dissertation as a monograph under the title "A Study in Reaction Time and Movement". He then traveled to Leipzig, Germany, to study with Wilhelm Wundt before returning to the United States. In these early years he wrote some articles for the Catholic Encyclopedia.

== Career ==
In 1910, at the University of California, Moore published "The Process of Abstraction", based on research he had begun while studying with Wundt. Also in 1910, he joined the faculty of the Catholic University of America as an instructor. In 1915, he received his M.D. from Johns Hopkins School of Medicine, after which he worked as a psychiatrist with the American Expeditionary Forces in Europe during World War I. From 1916 to 1918, he founded and ran a children's psychiatric clinic in Washington, D. C. This clinic also gave psychiatric training to psychology students, making it the first school in the United States to do so as a regular part of the psychology curriculum. He then returned to the Catholic University of America, where he became head of the department of psychology and psychiatry in 1939. He had a great influence on the career of priest and sociologist Paul Hanly Furfey. He retired from the Catholic University of America's faculty in 1947.

=== Benedictine Order ===
In 1919, at the age of forty-two, he left the Paulist Order and became a Benedictine instead. In 1924, he helped to found a Benedictine Priory, now known as St. Anselm's Abbey, in Washington, D. C. In 1926, he established the Saint Gertrude's School of Arts and Crafts, a school for intellectually disabled children, also in Washington, D. C.. Moore and the monks of St. Anselm's opened a secondary school, then known as the Priory School and now called St. Anselm's Abbey School, in 1942.

=== Carthusian Order ===
In 1947, Moore traveled to Spain to enter the Carthusians. In 1950, he returned to the United States to co-found the Charterhouse of the Transfiguration in Sandgate, Vermont, the first charterhouse in the country. In 1960, he returned to Spain, where he continued to live as a Carthusian for the rest of his life. He died in Burgos, Spain on June 5, 1969.
