= St. Anselm's Abbey (Washington, D.C.) =

Benedictine monastery in Washington, D.C.

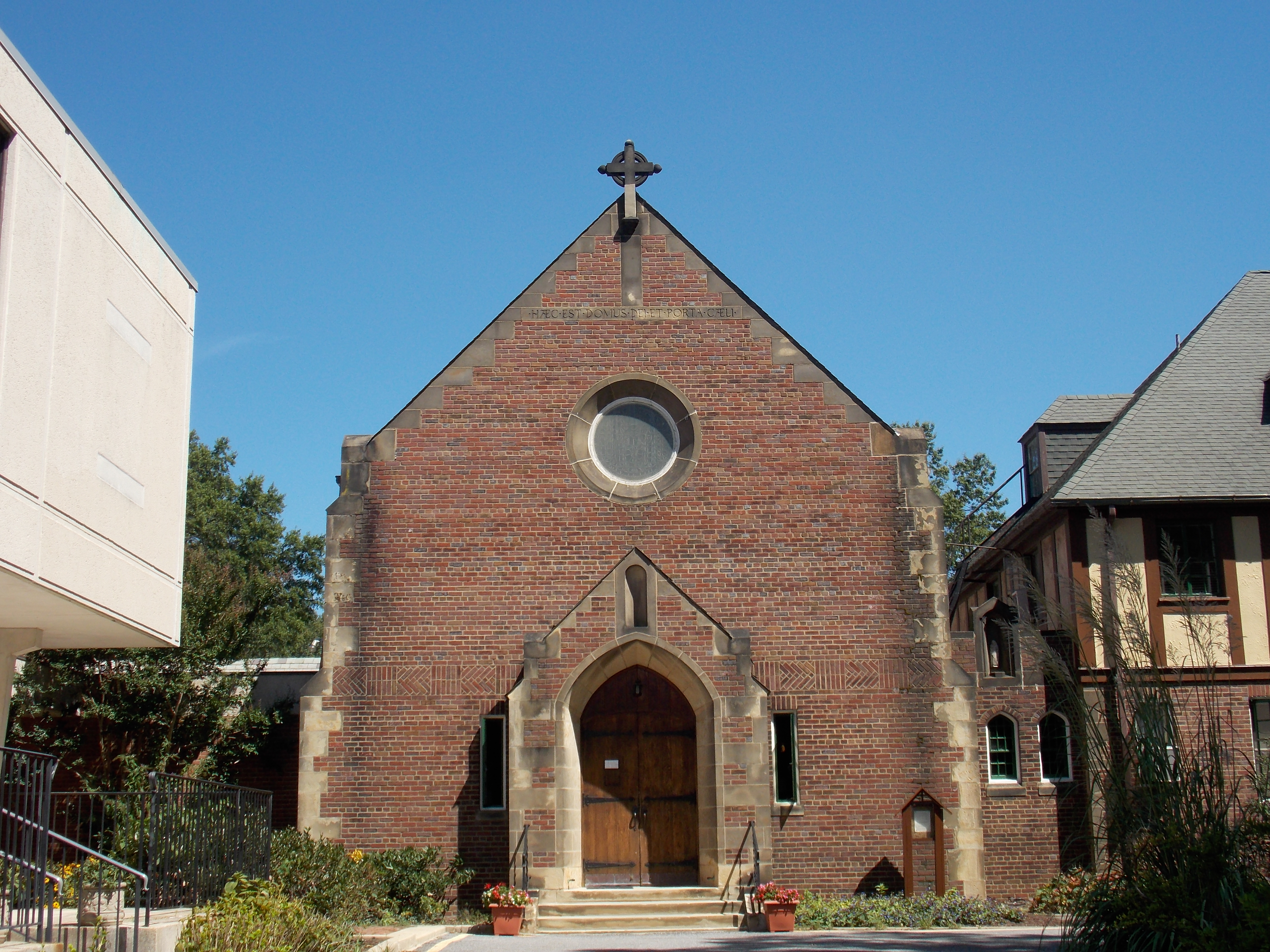

- Location within the District of Columbia Location within the United States

Monastery information
- Order: Benedictine
- Established: 1924
- Mother house: Fort Augustus Abbey
- Dedication: Saint Anselm of Canterbury
- Diocese: Archdiocese of Washington

People
- Abbot: James Wiseman, O.S.B.
- Prior: Samuel Springuel, O.S.B.
- Archbishop: Robert W. McElroy
- Important associated figures: Founder: Thomas Verner Moore, O.S.B.

Architecture
- Functional status: Abbey

Site
- Location: 4501 South Dakota Avenue, N.E.; Washington, DC
- Coordinates: 38°56′45.2″N 76°59′05.3″W
- Website: www.stanselms.org

St. Anselm's Abbey is an American Benedictine abbey in Washington, D.C. The abbey also operates St. Anselm's Abbey School, a middle and high school for boys which was ranked by the Washington Post as the most challenging school in Washington, D.C., as well as the most challenging private high school in the United States.

== History ==
In the early 1920s, a group of Americans under the direction of Fr. Thomas Verner Moore purchased a tract of land on Sargent Road. In 1923, St. Anselm's Priory was born. The house was formed under the sponsorship of Fort Augustus Abbey in Scotland, which provided monastic training and sponsorship for the new priory. It was named after St. Anselm of Canterbury, the eleventh-century English archbishop and theologian best known for his ontological argument for the existence of God. Initially, the monks were housed in an old farmhouse; the first church/monastery was built on a hill above South Dakota Avenue at 14th Street in 1930. A major addition was made to the monastery building in 1960, designed by noted architect Philip Johnson, to accommodate the growing number of monks.

In 1942, the monks opened the Priory School, and they became wholly dedicated to teaching at their own school. As the number of monks increased, the monastery was made a conventual priory of the English Benedictine Congregation. In 1961 Pope John XXIII elevated the priory to the rank of abbey and the name of the Priory School was changed to St. Anselm's Abbey School. Former prior Fr. Alban Boultwood, OSB, was named the first abbot and served in that capacity from 1961 to 1975; Abbot Alban died in his sleep on March 25, 2009.

Fr. Anselm Strittmatter, OSB, was the sub-prior at the priory in the years immediately preceding its 1961 elevation in rank. When Fr. Alban became the first abbot, Fr. Strittmatter was appointed the prior at the abbey. He was a scholar of ancient and medieval history and theology and in 1962 and in 1963 was affiliated with Princeton's Institute for Advanced Study.

== Present ==
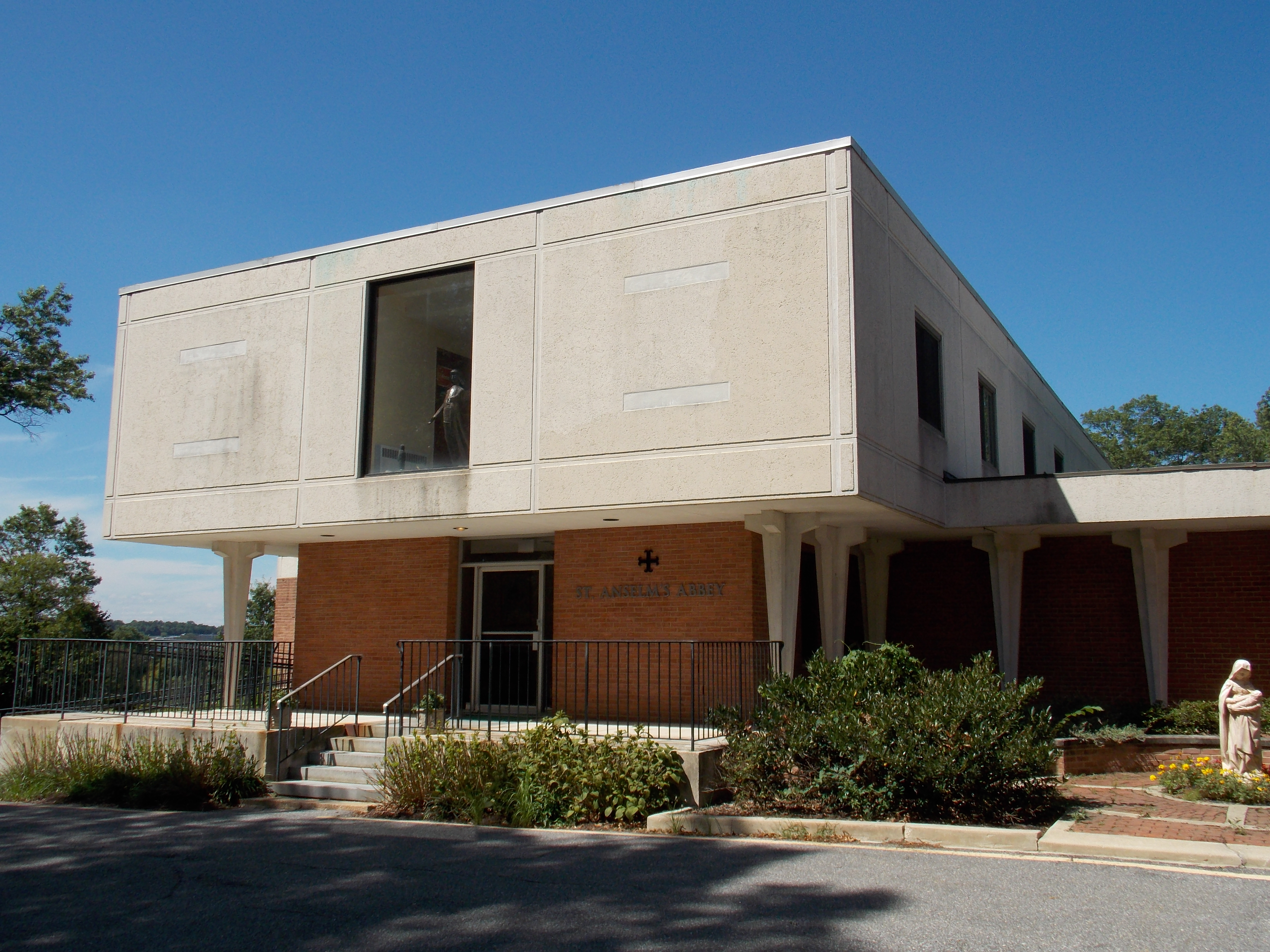
St. Anselm's Abbey

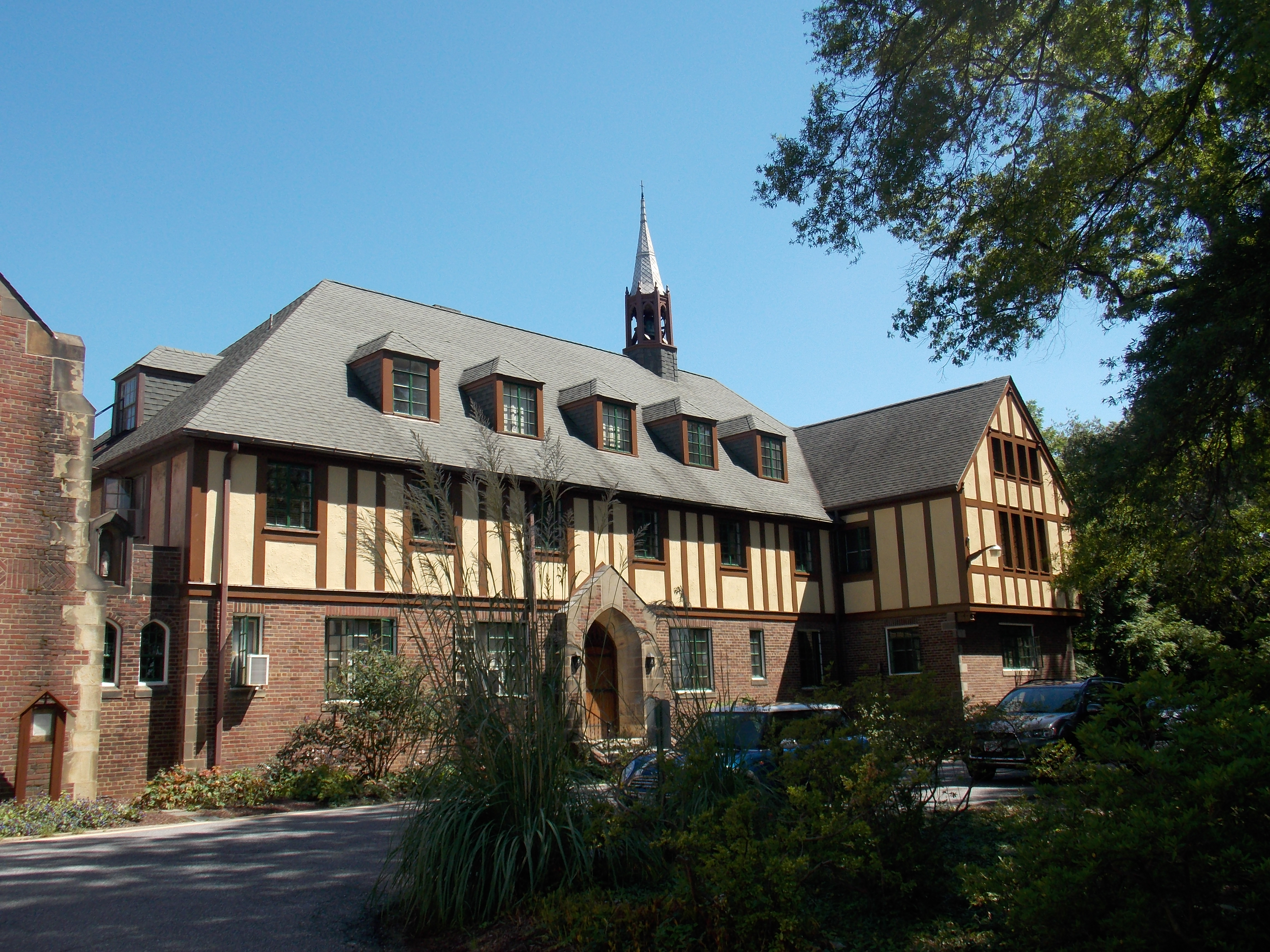
St. Anselm's original building

Presently, the abbey is led by Abbot James Wiseman, OSB, who was elected the community's fifth abbot on June 16, 2011. Wiseman replaced the abbey's previous superior and p prior-administrator Simon McGurk, OSB, who came to St. Anselm's from Belmont Abbey in England. The abbey's fourth abbot, Abbot Aidan Shea, OSB, stepped down after 16 years as abbot in June 2006. As of 2023 there are 10 monks in residence at the monastery, some of whom are involved in teaching, either at the abbey school or nearby at The Catholic University of America. The main work of the monks continues to be the running of St. Anselm's Abbey School. The abbey also has a large and active community of oblates.
