= Hans van Mourik Broekman =

Dutch headteacher

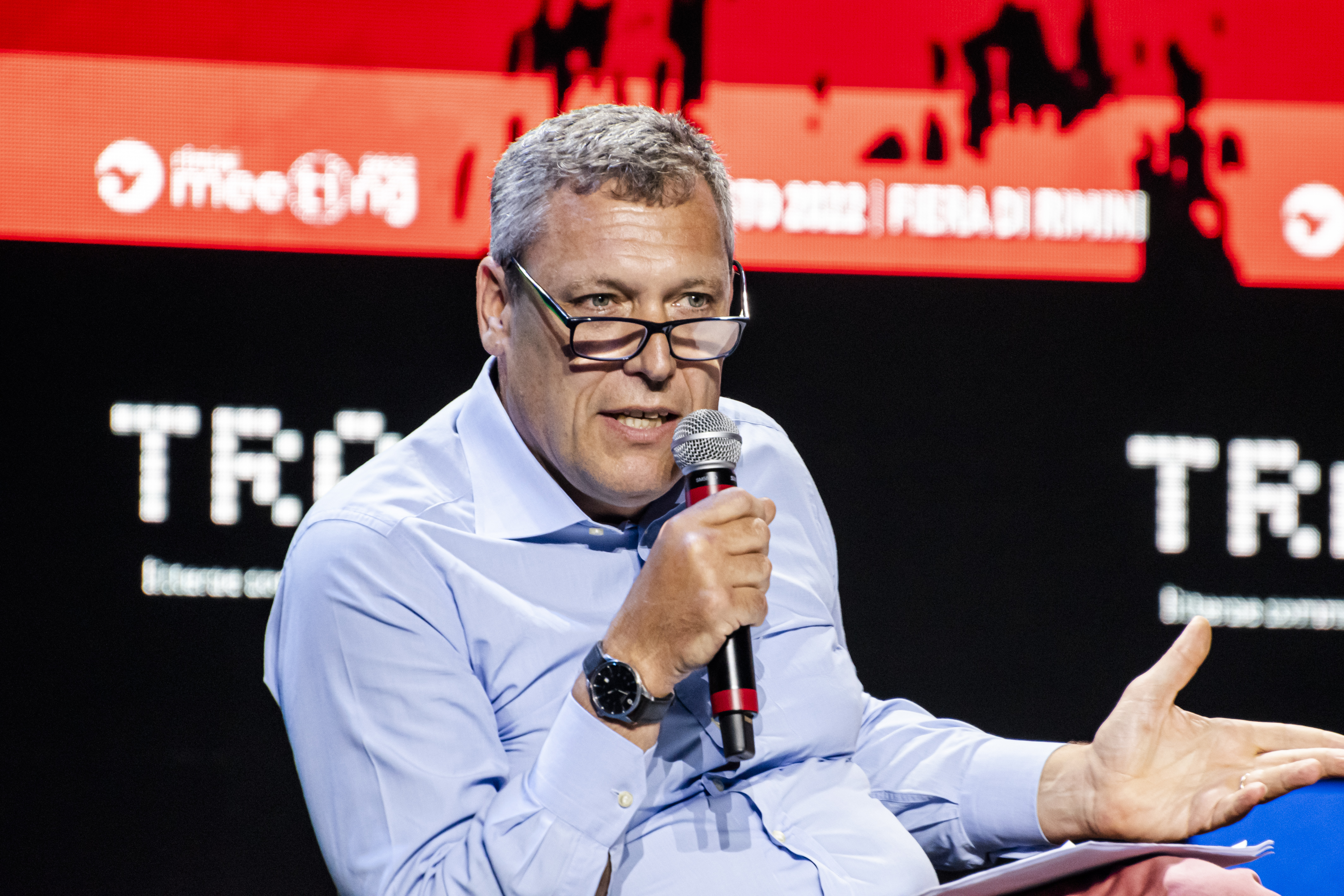
- Born: Johannes Bernardus van Mourik Broekman; 1966 (age 59–60)
- Citizenship: Dutch
- Education: University of St Andrews (MA)
- Occupations: Head Teacher, author
- Known for: Transitioning Liverpool College from private school to an Academy

Johannes Bernardus van Mourik Broekman is a Dutch teacher and former Head Master who was the Principal of Liverpool College having previously been a Head teacher at a number of Schools in the United States. He is noted as being the Principal of Liverpool College who oversaw the transition of the school from fee paying independent school to a state funded academy.

Broekman was born to Dutch parents, he attended high school in the United States at St. Anselm's Abbey School, then went on to earn a master's degree in classics in 1989 at the University of St Andrews in Fife, Scotland. Broekman then returned to the United States where he served as a deputy headmaster, headmaster, and Principal at schools in D.C., Arkansas, and Tennessee.

== Principal of Liverpool College ==
In 2008, Broekman became Principal of Liverpool College, at the time a private independent school in Liverpool, England.

In 2012, amid shrinking numbers at the school, Liverpool College made the decision to transition to an Academy, a state funded school independent of the local authority. Secretary of State for Education Michael Gove gave the go ahead to the college, and in September of 2013 it became the largest private school to convert voluntarily to an Academy, Labour Peer Lord Adonis described this decision as "“perhaps the single biggest breach in the Berlin Wall between the private and state sectors of education in recent decades.” Prior to the transition Broekman became aware that many parents wanted their children to attend but were unable to afford the fees. Broekman led the school through this transition and remained committed to maintaining the small-scale structure of the school's campus. Broekman believed that this change would also allow the school to reconnect with its founding mission, to serve the City of Liverpool, not to be exclusive.

Following the school’s transition to state-funded status, Broekman led Liverpool College through a period of significant expansion, with enrolment rising from 725 to over 1,500 students, and the school securing an “Outstanding in all areas” judgement in its 2019 Ofsted inspection report.

In March 2024, Broekman announced in a letter to the school's governing body that he would step down as Principal after over 16 years of running the school. He announced in the letter that he will go on to be the lay school Chaplin for schools in the Holy Family Catholic Multi Academy Trust. He officially left Liverpool College at the end of August 2024.

== Personal life ==
Broekman lives in Liverpool with his family, and currently serves on the council of the University of Liverpool as vice president. Broekman also gives talks at events on education and has written 3 books about his time being a head teacher. Later in life he began working as a chaplain at a catholic college/high school in the Wirral.
