= Thornton Friends School =

Thornton Friends School was a 6-12 Quaker school with three campuses, two in Silver Spring, Maryland, U.S., and one in Alexandria, Virginia in the Washington, D.C. metropolitan area. The Alexandria campus continued to operate as Alexandria Friends School from 2006-2012.

There was on average around 55 students in the Silver Spring Upper School and 15 students in the middle school; the Virginia upper school once had as many as 43 students. Classes at the upper schools averaged about 9 students, and the middle school averaged about 6.

== History ==
In 1972, Peter and Nancy Kline, both faculty members at Sandy Spring Friends School in Sandy Spring, MD approached their headmaster C. Thornton “Thorny” Brown, and asked permission to begin a separate program for students who either were not working out well at Sandy Spring, or who did not meet the school’s acceptance criteria. Their target student was the “bright underachiever,” and with Thorny’s blessing a separate program was started on the Sandy Spring campus.

The Klines first worked out of the infirmary at Sandy Spring, then relocated to a farm house in Brookeville. From there they moved to the school’s Silver Spring location, sharing the building with another program run by Bill and Lynn Godwin. These programs were collectively known as the Interlocking Curriculum School, the highlights of which were the yearly production of Shakespearean plays and a bi-annual trip to England.

The school struggled financially, and in 1983 Douglas Price was brought in to make recommendations as to how the school could become more viable. After Peter Kline resigned, Doug took over his classes, and in 1985 became head, succeeding interim head, Don Cassidy. During this time the school was renamed the Thornton Friends School, in honor of Thorny Brown, and the program changed to include five academic periods and the more conventional high school curriculum.

Doug Price served as Head until 1998. During his tenure, he was able to put the school on a more sound financial footing while opening the middle school in 1993 and the Northern Virginia upper school in 1997. The middle school was conceived as a feeder school for the upper school, and was run for its first five years by Carl Dolan. Since Carl's untimely death on a bicycle marathon, the school had four leaders, the last, Marcy Seitel, took over as principal in the fall of 2005.

The Northern Virginia campus opened as an upper school (grades 9-12) in Alexandria in response to the need for the whole school to grow as well as requests from the local Quaker meeting. Gail Miller was its first principal.

Initially Doug Price was principal both of the Maryland upper school and school head, but in 1995 Michael DeHart, then dean of students, became the upper school principal while Doug concentrated on his school head responsibilities. Michael remained in that position for three years, taking over as head when Doug retired at the end of the 1997-1998 school year. Norman Maynard, the last Maryland upper school principal, took over from Michael in August, 1998, and served as the last head of Thornton Friends School in 2009.

The Virginia upper school never quite grew to its targeted enrollment, and after a series of personnel changes, Thornton closed it at the end of the 2005-2006 academic year. That school reopened the following fall as the Alexandria Friends School, with students, faculty, and staff from the Thornton Virginia Campus. William Stewart, a teacher at the school, became head of the new school.

Under Michael DeHart’s tenure, the Thornton Friends School’s first mission statement was drafted in 2002, signifying the start of an ongoing process to commit to describing and writing down many of the school’s values and processes. In 2005, Michael engineered the first purchase of school property, which was adjacent to the Maryland upper school. Citing financial difficulties, Thornton closed at the end of the 2008-2009 school year, with both the Silver Spring Middle School and Upper School closing.

The Thornton program was offered from 2006-2012 by the Alexandria Friends School in the old Thornton-Virginia location on Seminary Road (except for the 2006-2007 school year). AFS closed its upper school at the end of the 2011-2012 school year, despite efforts to re-open the next year.
