= Paul Hanly Furfey =

American Catholic priest and sociologist (1896–1992)

Rev. Monsignor Paul Hanly Furfey
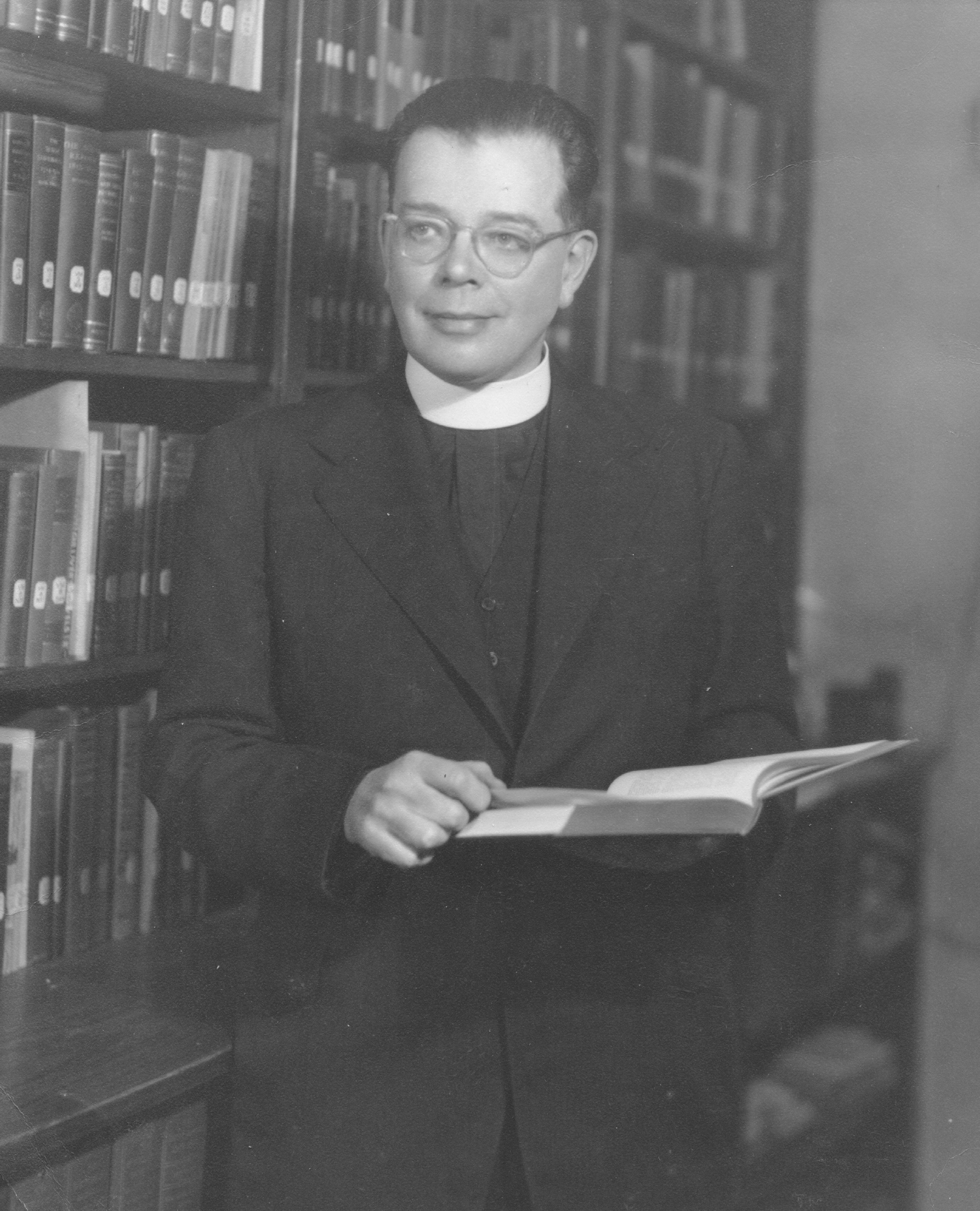

Personal life
- Born: June 30, 1896 Cambridge, Massachusetts, U.S.
- Died: June 12, 1992 (aged 95)

Religious life
- Religion: Roman Catholicism

Paul Hanly Furfey (1896 – 1992) was an American Catholic priest and sociologist, whom his biographer, Nicholas K. Rademacher, called "one of U.S. Catholicism’s greatest champions of peace and social justice." He was spiritual advisor to Servant of God Catherine de Hueck Doherty, founder of the Madonna House Apostolate and Friendship House, until she left Harlem and returned to Canada, and they remained frequent correspondents. He introduced Doherty to Servant of God Dorothy Day and Peter Maurin. Thomas Merton considered him a strong early spiritual influence who caused him to consider more deeply the path he eventually took, entering the Trappist monastery. The Association for the Sociology of Religion gives the Furfey lecture annually in his honor, and credits him with coining the term "metasociology" in a 1953 book.

== Early life and education ==
Furfey was born on June 30, 1896, to Margaret Hanly Connell Furfey and James A. Furfey in Cambridge, Massachusetts. After Catholic elementary and secondary education in Cambridge, he earned an A.B. (bachelor of arts) from Boston College in 1917. He studied psychology at Catholic University of America as a Knights of Columbus fellow, and then transferred, earning his master's degree from St. Mary's Seminary and University in 1918.

Furfey counted priest and psychologist-psychiatrist Thomas Verner Moore as one of his great influences. He was ordained to the priesthood of the Archdiocese of Baltimore in 1922 and began his doctoral work in sociology at Catholic University, graduating in 1926. He studied medicine in Germany on a sabbatical, where Rademacher writes that he witnessed the "increasingly desperate" and "polarized" political landscape there just before the start of the Second World War, from 1931 to 1932.

== Career ==
Moderate Catholic social thought advocates charity... but balks at social equality. It advocates world peace but takes no action that would greatly offend the militarists. It talks about the living wage, but becomes very cautious in discussing specific strikes. It discusses social justice, but fawns on wealthy [people] and politicians.

— Msgr. Paul Hanly Furfey, "Catholic Extremism," Part I, a two-part article published in the journal Preservation of the Faith, 3:5, February 1936.

Furfey described himself as a radical, calling out everyday citizens who tolerate slavery, genocide, and the bombing of noncombatants as "respectable murderers." He was influenced by the Catholic-left religious communities such as the Bowery's Catholic Worker, founded by his friends Dorothy Day and Peter Maurin, Harlem's Friendship House, founded by his spiritual directee Catherine Doherty, and the settlement house movement.

As chair of sociology at Catholic University for 32 years, from 1934 to 1966, he became what Santa Clara professor of spirituality Bruce H. Lescher calls "one of the leading spokespersons of the Catholic left." In 2003 Catholic University held a symposium, "The Intellectual and Moral Heritage of the Rev. Paul Hanly Furfey."

== Community houses for social justice in Washington, D.C. ==
In 1936, with sociologist Gladys Sellew and department colleague Mary Elizabeth Walsh, he cofounded Il Poverello House at 2119 Tenth Street, N.W. The name of the house came from St. Francis of Assisi, who was known as "Il Poverello," the little poor man. There they demonstrated that they could live on 15 cents a day, the rough equivalent of $3 in the 2020s. Emanuel A. Romero, a prominent Black Catholic author advocating interracial justice, wrote in detail of the house, describing it as coming "as close to the heart of Catholic interracial work as anything I know." Furfey was also closely involved with two other such houses, Fides House, where Catholic University nursing students joined the mix of sociologists living with low-income residents of the Shaw neighborhood, and Emmaus House in the university's own Brookland neighborhood, both of which drew the attention of Eleanor Roosevelt.
