= Death of Keenan Anderson =

2023 death following an arrest

- Keenan Anderson
- Location: 33.99406°N 118.45275°W; Venice, Los Angeles, California, U.S.
- Date: January 3, 2023 c. 3:35 p.m. (arrest) c. 8:00 p.m. (death) (PT)
- Deaths: 1
- Coroner: Los Angeles County Coroner

Keenan Anderson was an African American man who died on January 3, 2023, about four and a half hours after he was restrained and tasered six times by a member of the Los Angeles Police Department (LAPD). He was a cousin of Patrisse Cullors, co-founder of the Black Lives Matter movement.

Anderson was restrained due to suspicion of a hit-and-run and driving under the influence following a traffic collision and due to a witness testimony of an individual attempting to get in their car without their permission. Police ordered Anderson to sit down, which he initially did. Later, Anderson ran away into traffic, leading to police subduing and tasing him for around 30 seconds and then another five seconds.

An autopsy conducted by the L.A. County Medical Examiner found that Anderson died from the effects of an enlarged heart and cocaine use. The specific manner of Anderson's death was undetermined.

== Biography ==
Keenan Darnell Anderson, who was aged 31 at the time of his death, was a tenth-grade high school English teacher at the Digital Pioneers Academy in Washington, D.C. Anderson was visiting his family in Los Angeles during the winter break when the incident occurred. He was a father, and he was the cousin of Patrisse Cullors, who co-founded the Black Lives Matter social movement.

== Arrest and death ==
On January 3, 2023, at around 3:35 p.m., an LAPD officer was informed about a vehicular accident at the intersection of Venice Boulevard and Lincoln Boulevard in Venice, Los Angeles. According to LAPD Police Chief Michel Moore, Anderson had committed a felony hit-and-run in a traffic collision and tried to "get into another person's car without their permission". LAPD has released cellphone footage from a witness, who said: "I am Uber driver and he was trying to steal my car while he hit other cars right here".

Police body camera footage showed Keenan Anderson running in the middle of the road, asking a motorcycle-riding officer to help him. When the officer followed Anderson's direction, he encountered people that pointed to Anderson. The people indicated that Anderson caused the vehicular accident, police stated.

The officer re-engaged Anderson, who was still in the middle of the road. The footage showed Anderson in a distressed state, telling the officer "somebody is trying to kill me", but the footage did not show any visible threat to Anderson. Anderson moved onto the sidewalk, as per the officer's instruction. Anderson tells the officer, "I didn't mean to". The officer made a report that Anderson was possibly under the influence. Anderson tells the officer that he lost his key, and had someone come and fix his car for him. Anderson also sat down, as per the officer's instruction. When the officer asked Anderson who was trying to kill him, Anderson replies: "I had a stunt today, sir. I need to. Like, no, no, no." Anderson also said that someone was trying to "put stuff" in his car.

Around seven minutes later, Anderson attempted to escape, police stated. The footage showed Anderson standing up and asking for water; the officer replied that he will get water for Anderson, while directing Anderson to sit against a wall. Anderson said he wanted people to see him, so the officer told Anderson to sit on the sidewalk, nearer to the intersection, so that Anderson can be seen. Anderson walked onto the road, with the officer calling him back. Anderson then ran away on the road as more police arrived.

The motorcycle-riding officer quickly catches up with Anderson, in the middle of the road, and the backup officers also arrive. Anderson sits down, turns to his side, then appears briefly to try to stand up. The motorcycle-riding officer and two other officers grab Anderson, who cries for help and says that the police are trying to kill him. "They're trying to George Floyd me!" Anderson said, referring to the murder of George Floyd by police in 2020. The officers held Anderson down, told him to calm down, and warned him 13 times that if he does not stop, a Taser will be used on him. Anderson says that the officers are "actors" and repeatedly shouts "C Lo". At one point, one officer presses his forearm into Anderson's chest, with that officer's elbow on Anderson's neck, while another officer said: "watch your elbow, partner." An officer used a taser on Anderson, with the first two taser activations being fired from afar, which failed to make skin contact. The officer then applied the taser via drive-stun on Anderson's back. In total Anderson was tasered six times in 42 seconds.

Anderson was handcuffed by officers, and his legs were also bound. Anderson says: "This is an act...They're not police". After being restrained, Anderson said: "They think I killed C Lo...They're trying to sedate me...I know too much...They sedated me."

After his arrest, Anderson was transported to a local hospital where he died approximately four and a half hours later, becoming the third person to die in LAPD custody in 2023.

== Investigation ==
A preliminary police toxicology report indicated that blood samples taken from Anderson included cocaine and marijuana.

LAPD announced investigations into Anderson's death and the deaths of civilians Takar Smith and Oscar Sanchez who were both fatally shot in two unconnected incidents by police on January 2 and 3, 2023. Los Angeles mayor Karen Bass pledged "that that the City's investigations into these deaths will be transparent and will reflect the values of Los Angeles” and that the officers involved would be placed on immediate leave. She also stated that regardless of what the investigations determine, "we must reduce the use of force overall, and I have absolutely no tolerance for excessive force."

On January 11, 2023, the LAPD released footage recorded by the body-cameras of several responding officers. Chief Moore stated that the footage was expedited for release due to public interest.

On June 2, 2023, an autopsy report from the Los Angeles County coroner found that Anderson died from "effects of cardiomyopathy and cocaine use", and that his death was "determined hours after restraint and conducted energy device use". It also confirmed the presence of cocaine and benzoylecgonine in his body. The specific manner of Anderson's death was undetermined. Bass responded to the report by stating, "the coroner raises questions that still must be answered, and I await the result of the investigation already underway".

== Aftermath ==
Anderson's cousin, Patrisse Cullors, who is the co-founder of the Black Lives Matter movement, called for Chief Moore and the involved officers to resign; she described the incident as being that Anderson "needed care and he did not get care. He was stolen from us. He was killed". Later in January 2023, Anderson's family announced their intention to sue the city of Los Angeles, filing a $50 million claim against the city and claiming that police officers performed an "unlawful assault and battery". The family subsequently sued the LAPD for $100 million.

Protests over Anderson's death were held in Los Angeles in January and February 2023.
