= Edmund Burke School =

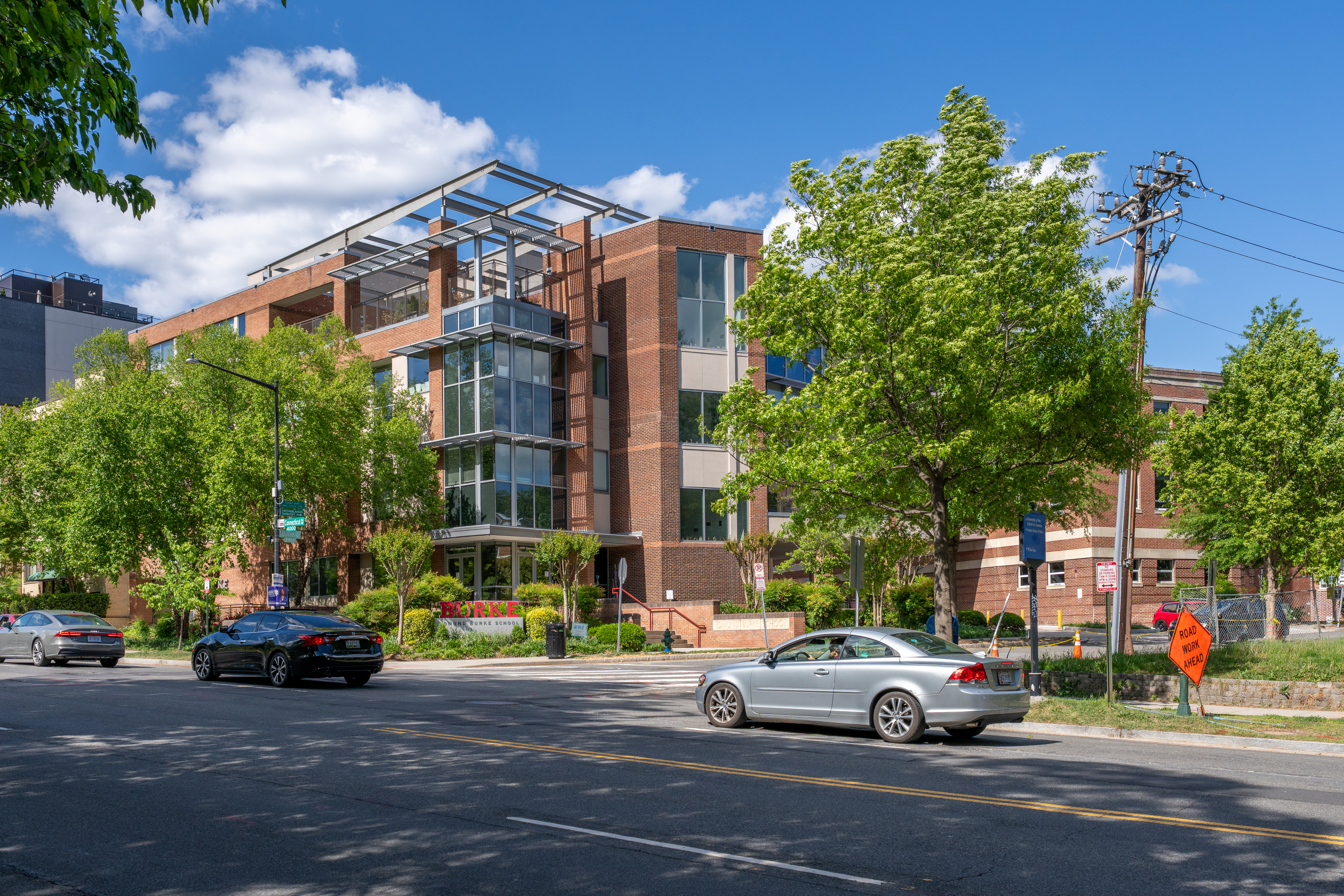

Location
- 4101 Connecticut Avenue NW; Washington, D.C. 20008; United States; 38°56′32″N 77°3′43″W

Information
- Type: Private Preparatory School
- Established: 1968 (58 years ago)
- CEEB code: 090064
- Head of School: Steve McManus
- Faculty: 50
- Grades: 6-12
- Enrollment: 300 students
- Average class size: 12
- Student to teacher ratio: 6:1
- Colors: Burgundy, light blue, gray
- Athletics conference: Potomac Valley Athletic Conference
- Mascot: Bengal
- Rival: The Field School
- Accreditation: Association of Independent Maryland & DC Schools
- Newspaper: The Cageliner
- Yearbook: The Paw Print
- Website: www.burkeschool.org

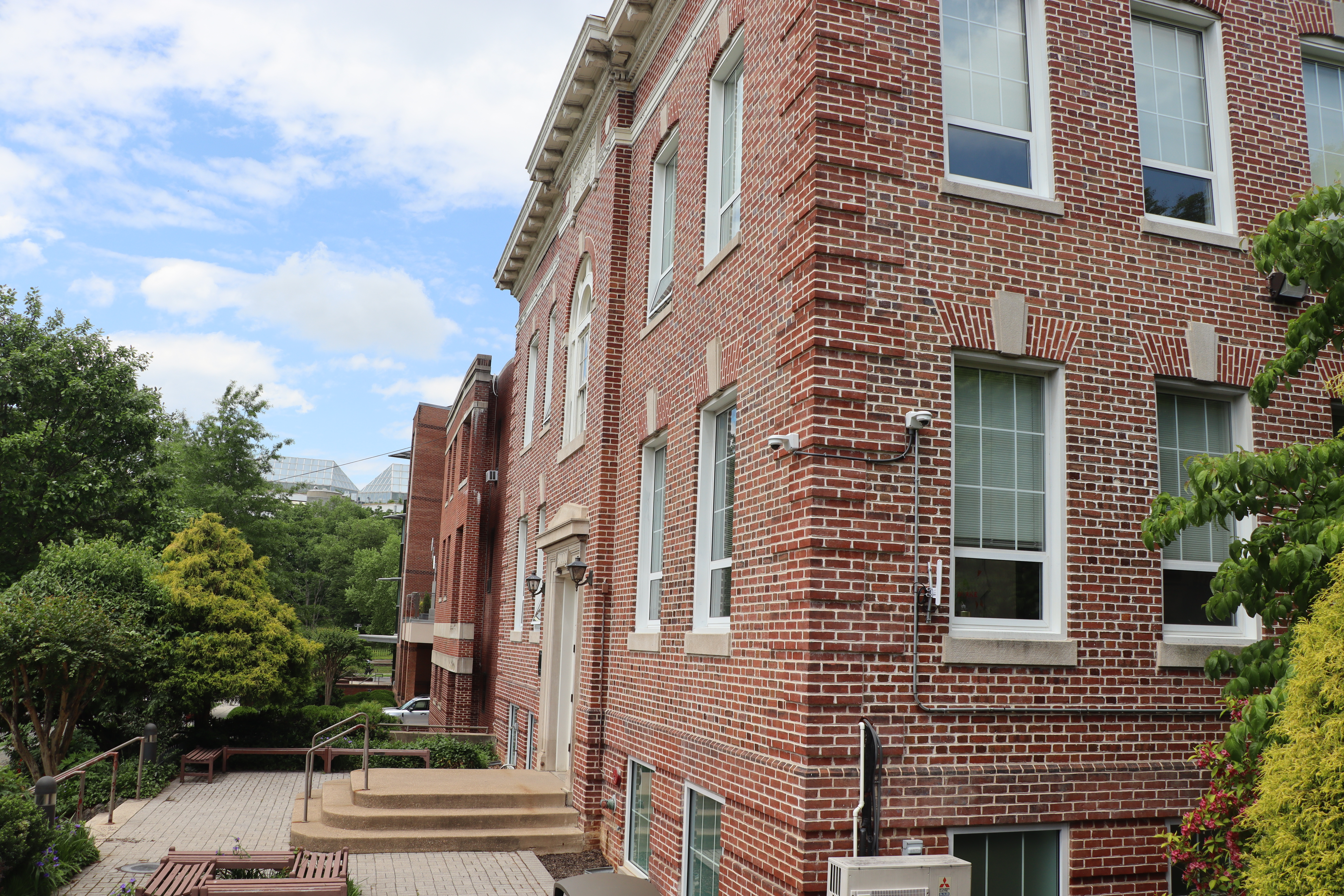
View facing west from the main high school building

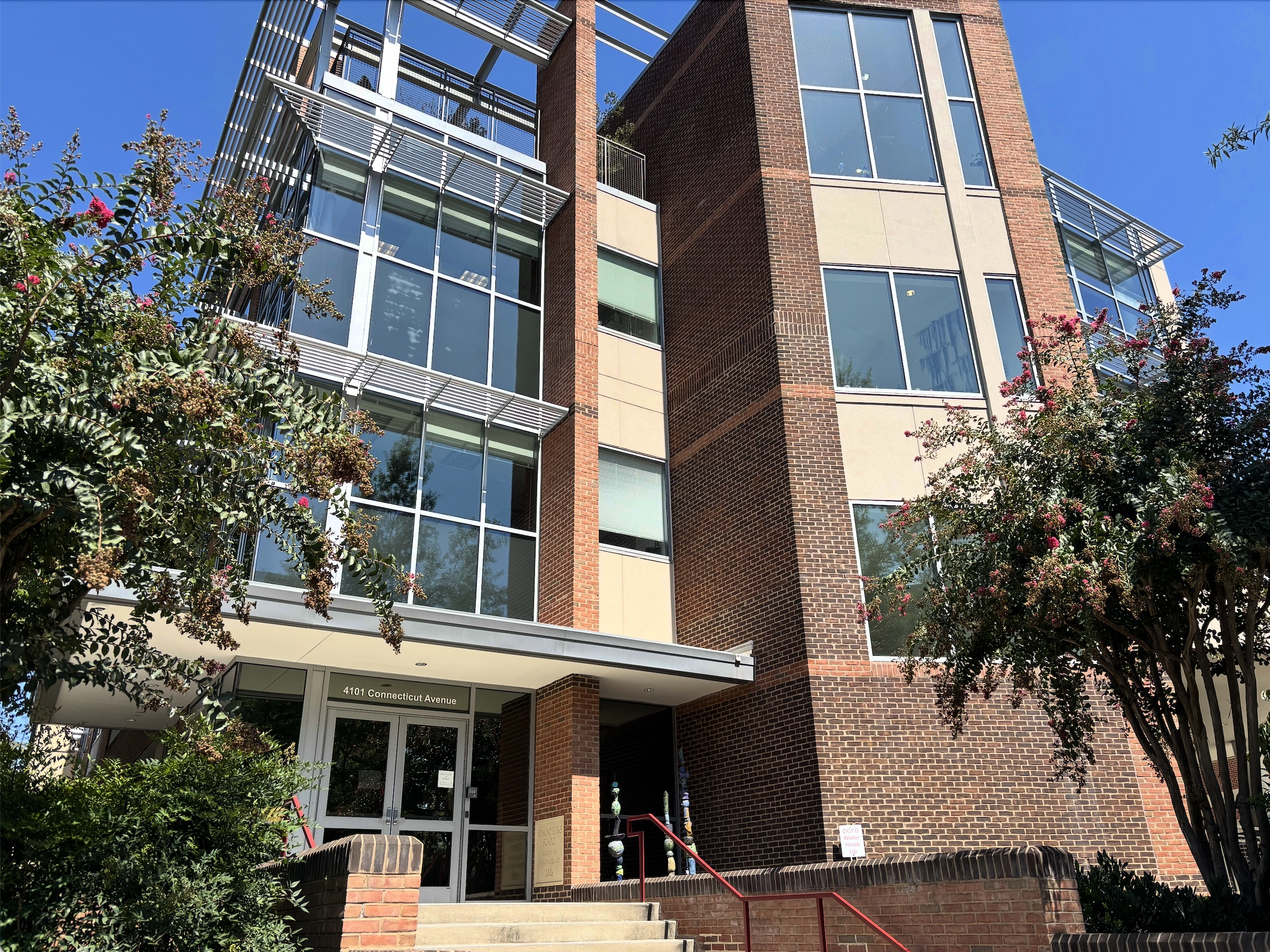
Main school entrance on Connecticut & Upton

Edmund Burke School is an independent college preparatory school in Washington, D.C. Located on Connecticut Avenue NW, two blocks from the Van Ness - UDC metro station, Burke is home to a middle school (grades 6-8) and high school (grades 9-12).

Founded in 1968 by Jean Mooskin and Dick Roth, the school practices progressive pedagogy: classes and advisory groups are small, teachers go by their first names, and students have significant independence.

The school was named for 18th century British parliamentarian and philosopher Edmund Burke, who wrote, "When bad men combine, the good must associate; else they will fall one by one." These words are often cited as inspiration for the saying, "The only thing necessary for the triumph of evil is for good men to do nothing."

== History ==
Edmund Burke School was founded in 1968 by Roth and Mooskin, who met while teaching at the Hawthorne School, which would close in 1982. Burke first opened at 2107 Wyoming Avenue NW and initially enrolled 17 students. Elizabeth Ely, a teacher at Burke when it opened, went on to found The Field School in 1972, and the two schools later became athletic rivals. In 1971, Burke's growth prompted a move to 2120 Wyoming Avenue NW. In 1973, the school purchased 2955 Upton Street NW, which it later expanded to add a gymnasium and other facilities.

In 2003, Burke earned city approval to expand its facilities with a new building that would increase both size and capacity. A new building, dedicated primarily to the middle school division and the school's visual and performing arts programs, opened in 2006. All buildings are connected.

In summer 2021, Burke began a renovation to the historic high school building, which resulted in a new ceramics studio, renovated space for digital and wet photography, community gathering space, new fitness center, and a lunch servery.

Co-founders Mooskin and Roth retired in 1999, and David Shapiro became the Head of School. The current Head of School is Steve McManus.

=== 2022 shooting ===
On April 22, 2022, a gunman armed with four rifles modified to fire on fully-automatic and mounted with scopes, along with two handguns and more than 1,000 rounds of ammunition, positioned himself on the fifth floor of an apartment building adjacent to the school. He proceeded to fire at least 239 shots toward the school and other nearby buildings, wounding four people, and breaking glass in the school. During the incident, the gunman posted a video of the shooting on 4chan and edited the school's Wikipedia page to report the incident. About five hours later, police found and breached the apartment of the gunman; they found him dead from a self-inflicted gunshot wound to the head.

== Profile ==
Burke enrolls approximately 215-225 high school students (Grades 9–12) and 75-85 middle school students (Grades 6–8). In 2025–26, those students represent 54 different zip codes in DC, Maryland, and Virginia and 40% self-identify as people of color. The Class of 2025 is attending 46 different colleges and universities in the United States and Canada.

The school employs roughly 70 faculty and staff, and more than two-thirds of teachers hold advanced degrees. The average class size is 12 students, and high school students can pursue independent studies and serve as teaching assistants. All graduating seniors complete an independent senior project.

The school dedicates 15% of its annual budget to Financial Aid and, on average, one-third of Burke families receive financial aid.

=== Advanced Placement ===
Each academic department at Burke offers a combination of Advanced Placement (AP) and advanced-designated courses. Current AP offerings include: Biology, Calculus AB, Calculus BC, Chemistry, English Literature, French Language, Physics C, Spanish Language, and United States History.

=== Experiential Learning ===
Burke emphasizes experiential education and frequently incorporates field work and trips into the school day, with more than 100 trips recorded in 2025-26. Burke is a participating school with the Independent Schools Experiential Education Network (ISEEN).

== Facilities ==
The school has two buildings, affectionately dubbed "Calvin" and "Hobbes," referring to the 16th and 17th century philosophers, their eponymous comic strip characters, or both.

Burke is located on a major DC road (Connecticut Avenue NW) and less than two blocks from a Metro station. The four-story urban campus includes a black box theater, a gym, library, computer lab, ceramics studio, photography studio, and two music rooms. Burke's athletics teams practice and play at Howard Field (Howard University School of Law), UDC Athletic Fields, and UDC Pool/Natatorium (University of the District of Columbia), just across the street.

Burke is also located less than 20 minutes (on foot) from Rock Creek Park, National Zoological Park (United States), and Levine School of Music.

== Athletics ==
The Burke Bengals compete primarily in the Potomac Valley Athletic Conference (PVAC). Burke offers varsity teams in Volleyball, Cross Country, Soccer, Basketball, Swimming, Baseball, Track and Field, Ultimate Frisbee, Golf, and Softball, which won three consecutive championship titles in 2017-19. Burke has a "no-cut" policy, such that all interested students can have a place on a team, regardless of ability. Varsity teams do require annual tryouts.

=== Recent Conference Championships ===
- Golf - 2026
- Soccer (girls, middle school) - 2023
- Swimming (overall) - 2025-26; swimming (boys) - 2024-25, 205-26; swimming (girls) - 2023-24

== Accreditation ==
- Association of Independent Maryland and DC Schools
- Middle States Association of Colleges and Schools

== Notable alumni ==
- Dana Brozost-Kelleher, Pulitzer Prize-winning investigative journalist
- Zach Cregger, director, actor, and comedian
- Laura Curran, politician and Nassau County (N.Y.) executive
- Cecilia D'Anastasio, journalist
- Christopher Dyer, politician and gay rights activist also known as Cookie Buffet
- Annie Flanagan, New York Times photographer
- Romilio Hernandez, soccer player
- Adam B. Lerner, political scientist at University of Massachusetts Lowell
- Carl Sciacchitano, author and illustrator
- Darko Tresnjak, Tony Award-winning director
- Ben White, financial journalist
