= Sandy Spring Friends School =

Quaker school in Maryland, US

Coordinates: 39°8′2.84″N 77°1′43.66″W

- 16923 Norwood Road, Sandy Spring, Maryland, U.S.

Information
- Type: Independent, 501(c)(3)
- Motto: Let Your Lives Speak
- Religious affiliation: Quaker
- Established: September 1961; 65 years ago
- Head of school: Acting Head of School: Meredith Shankle; Incoming Head of School: Brooke Carroll (January 2027)
- Grades: Pre-K (age 3) to 12th (age 18)
- Enrollment: 675 (2024–2025 school year)
- Colors: green, gold
- Website: www.ssfs.org

Sandy Spring Friends School (SSFS) is an American private college preparatory Quaker school serving students from preschool (age three) through 12th grade (age eighteen). It is coeducational and progressive. Founded in 1961, its motto is "Let Your Lives Speak", an old Quaker adage which expresses the school's philosophy of "educating all aspects of a person so that their life—in all of its facets—can reveal the unique strengths within". SSFS sits on a 140-acre campus in the center of Montgomery County, Maryland, United States. SSFS is under the care of the Sandy Spring Monthly Meeting and the Baltimore Yearly Meeting. After previously announcing plans for closure, the Board of Trustees released a statement in April 2025 saying that funding had been secured to keep the school open until at least the close of the 2027–2028 school year. Since that time, additional fundraising efforts as well as significant leadership changes have stabilized the school, and it is now committed to remaining open indefinitely.

== History ==
=== Sherwood Friends School ===
The establishment of SSFS was preceded by the Sherwood Friends School (also known as Sherwood Academy) as the first Quaker school located in Sandy Spring, from 1883 to 1906. After 1906, Sherwood Academy became part of the Montgomery County public school system, eventually becoming the Sherwood High School. Sherwood Academy occupied the old Ashton Orthodox Quaker Meeting House, which was later relocated to the SSFS campus.

=== Founding and early years ===
The establishment of a new Quaker school in the Sandy Spring community was first suggested by S. Brook Moore, a cabinetmaker, at a meeting for business of the Sandy Spring Friends Monthly Meeting in 1958. Although some were initially skeptical of the idea, the next day Brook received a $100 check and a group of concerned Friends formed a school committee shortly thereafter. Esther Scott followed by donating several acres of her family farm for the school and an adjacent Friends Center. Sam Legg, who had participated in the Minnesota Starvation Experiment while serving in the Civilian Public Service as a conscientious objector during World War II, was appointed the school's first headmaster in 1959. The cornerstone of its first building was laid on July 10, 1960, and it was dedicated on November 20, 1960. SSFS opened its doors in September 1961 with 77 students in grades 10 and 11. A twelfth grade was added a year later.

The school's first buildings were the Headmaster's home, named “Scott House” after Esther Scott, and a dormitory, named “Moore Hall” after Brook Moore, with room for 46 students. The dormitory building also held two faculty apartments and classrooms, plus the school's kitchen and dining room, library, laboratory and lockers on the lower level. The school quickly outgrew the original buildings, and over the next decade additional classrooms, an arts center, faculty housing, an infirmary and a second dormitory with expanded kitchen and dining facilities were constructed.

In 1973, a 9th-grade program was added, with classes initially held in the nearby Sandy Spring Community House but later being brought onto the main campus in 1990. In 1980, SSFS expanded to include a middle school, and the lower school was added as a result of the 1993 merger with Friends Elementary School. Beginning in the 2016–2017 school year, the preschool program expanded to include three-year-olds, so that SSFS could serve students from age 3 through 12th grade.

In December 2024, the school announced that the boarding program would sunset at the end of the school year.

On April 14, 2025, the SSFS Board of Trustees sent an announcement to the community that the entire school would close down at the end of the 2024–2025 school year, citing financial difficulties. However, following fundraising efforts by the community that raised millions of dollars, the Board of Trustees announced on April 23, 2025 that SSFS would remain open. Since that time, the School has announced that it had secured additional funds and that it is committed to remaining open.

=== Heads of school ===
- Sam Legg (1961–1964)
- John H. Burrowes (1964–1966)
- C. Thornton "Thorny" Brown, Jr. (1966 (Note: Administrator from 1966–67; appointed Head in 1968)–1979)
- Edwin E. Hinshaw (1979–1991)
- Stephen L. Gessner (1991–1996)
- Kenneth W. Smith (1996–2010)
- Tom Gibian (2010–2020)
- Rodney Glasgow (2020–2024)
- Christine Lewis (Note: Interim Head of School) (Interim; August–November 2024)
- Sue Groesbeck (Interim; November 2024–June 2025)
- Dr. Sean Hamer (July 2025 – July 2026)
- Meredith Shankle (Acting Head of School, July-December 2026)
- Brooke Carroll (January 2027)

== Campus and facilities ==
The 144-acre campus includes woods, a stream, a pond (which was made safe for swimming in 2011), two solar arrays, an educational farm, cross-country trails, and several athletic fields. Buildings on campus include two lower school, one middle school, and one upper school facility, as well as a historic Quaker Meeting house, dining hall, performing arts center, visual arts facility, library, health center, café, administrative buildings, and two gymnasiums. The school's library includes computers for online research through online subscription reference tools and the Internet.

The historic wooden Ashton Meeting House (built 1881) was moved onto the SSFS campus in 1983, and a new library and gymnasium were constructed in 1987.

From 2003 to 2005, the school engaged in a campaign to expand and update the SSFS campus with the construction of three major buildings: the Performing Arts Center, which includes a theater with stadium seating for 385, studio spaces and practice rooms; an Athletic Complex, which includes a fitness center, training room, a 9,000 square feet (840 m^{2}) gymnasium, and a rock climbing wall (added in 2011); and a new Middle School building. As part of the construction project, the road and parking lots created around the periphery of the campus enabled the interior of the campus to be a pedestrian-only space with a grass quad at its center, and the dining hall was expanded, along with renovations to several existing buildings.

On Nov. 12, 2019, the SSFS community gathered for the groundbreaking of a new Upper School building. Construction on the building continued from 2019 to 2020, even while students were in "virtual learning" mode during spring and fall of 2020 due to the COVID-19 pandemic. In January 2021, SSFS moved to a hybrid instruction mode, and Upper School "on-campus" students began their second semester in the newly completed Upper School building, named Pen Y Bryn after the family home of former Head of School Tom Gibian. Pen Y Bryn is "net-zero ready" and was the first in the Montgomery County region to be constructed following the new International Green Construction Code (IgCC).

== Academics ==
Sandy Spring Friends School is accredited by the Association of Independent Maryland Schools and approved by the Maryland Department of Education. It is a member of the Friends Council on Education and the National Association of Independent Schools. SSFS is a college preparatory school, its academic programs are inquiry-based and student-centered, focusing on experiential learning. Students are taught a process called "QRA" (question, reflection, action), with the purpose of "encourag[ing] students to question concepts and ideas, reflect on inquiry and experience, and put learning into action".

The Lower School (Pre-K–Grade 5; ages 3–11) curriculum includes Language Arts (Reading and Writing), Mathematics, Science, Social Studies, Spanish, Art, Music, Physical/Outdoor Education, as well as social-emotional learning and conflict resolution skills.

The Middle School (Grades 6– 8, ages 11–15 ) curriculum includes English, History, Mathematics, Science, World Languages (Spanish and French), Arts, Physical Education, and Health. Other Middle School programs include an advisory program, community service opportunities, and overnight and day trips in the fall and spring.

The Upper School (Grades 9–12, ages 14–18) curriculum includes Advanced Placement (AP) course offerings in all departments. SSFS students must complete a minimum of 21 total academic credits in English (4 credits, mandatory each semester), History (3 credits, including U.S. History or AP U.S. History), Math (3 credits, minimum completion of at least Algebra II), Science (3 credits, including one biology lab and one physical lab science), World Language (3 credits, Spanish or French), Arts (3 credits), and Electives (2 credits).Additionally, students must participate in 6 Physical Education/athletics activities, Quaker education, a one-week immersive experiential education program (called Intersession), and must complete a minimum of 100 hours of community service. Students can also participate in academic clubs such as Quiz Bowl, Model United Nations, and Speech and Debate. College Counseling is offered, as well as Learning Support Services; academic help sessions are part of the academic day schedule.

== Demographics ==
Sandy Spring Friends School's total enrollment for the 2024–2025 school year was 675 students. As of 2025, 4% of the student body were Quakers and 49% people of color.

== Athletics ==
The Middle School teams and the Upper School boys' and girls' athletic teams compete in the Potomac Valley Athletic Conference (PVAC);. SSFS offers the following varsity and junior-varsity sports:

- Women's: Cross Country; Volleyball; Soccer; Basketball; Track & Field; Softball; Tennis; and Lacrosse.
- Men's: Cross Country; Soccer; Basketball; Track & Field; Lacrosse; and Baseball
- Coed: Climbing, Golf, Swimming, and Hockey (club team).

== Student government and publications ==
The Wildezine is an Upper School student newspaper. Other student publications include a literary magazine and a yearbook.

Each division has a student body representative group: "Spark" in the Lower School, "Flame" in the Middle School, and "Torch" in the Upper School. Student representatives from these groups are tasked with discussing and seeking solutions for issues raised by the student body in accordance with Quaker practices.

== Traditions ==
Some of SSFS's notable traditional activities, which date to the earliest days of the school, include the following:

- The Morley Games. The outdoor games of Frazleerham, Hoop-a-Doop, Brindledorph, Nurdleybawl and Friedlefrappe were invented by Barry Morley, a long-time SSFS teacher. The Morley Games, inspired by limited funds and facilities early in the school's history, made use of everyday objects, and continued to be played long after the introduction of soccer, lacrosse and other sports to the school's curriculum. Brindledorph, a field hockey-like game, is played with ordinary brooms, and Hoop-a-Doop with old bicycle tires. Nurdleybawl (a variation on tee-ball) uses a small rubber ball and sawed-off softball bat. Frazleerham, a combination of rugby, soccer, basketball and ultimate Frisbee, is played with a soccer ball and wastepaper can (held by the “frazsnapper”) standing in a small enclosure (10’ x 10’ x 2’) or “rham” made of 2-by-4's. In Friedlefrappe, a “friedlesphere” (a ball) is thrown up to a “friedlesnatcher” (goalie) standing on a “friedleplat” (an elevated platform) who attempts to catch it with a “friedlesnare” (a net on a pole), and defended by a “friedlefrapper” swinging a broom.
- Spirit Week. Held within the first few weeks of the school year, this recent school tradition is a weeklong event that features a number of school-wide and division-wide activities, such as "Twin Day" (students dress alike), "Pajama Day" (come to school dressed in pajamas), “Green and Gold Day” (students and faculty are requested to wear green or yellow clothing), and "Crazy Hat and Hair Day."
- Community Day. Held in the fall, Community Day began as "Mountain Day," in which the entire school would travel to nearby Sugarloaf Mountain for a picnic and a day of exploration. In the mid-1970s the venue changed to Catoctin Quaker Camp. As the size of the school grew and the logistics of transporting the entire school over long distances became more difficult, Mountain Day evolved into Community Day, a day of campus-based work projects (such as trail maintenance, tending to the community garden, and bus waxing races), followed by school-wide games.
- Our People, Our Planet Day. Similar to Community Day, Our People, Our Planet Day (formerly known as Earth Stewardship Day) is an all-school event held in the spring. Our People, Our Planet Day (OPOP Day) is a day dedicated to a dual focus of environmental literacy and greater understanding of the unique social, global, and cultural composition of all SSFS community members.
- Intersession. In the week before spring break each school year, all SSFS Upper School students are required to participate in an Intersession, a trip of experiential learning that supplements the traditional school curriculum. Intersessions often involve community service, physical activity, or environmental stewardship. In the past, Intersession trips have gone to Florida, Senegal, Korea, Sicily, and numerous other locations.
- Strawberry Cowbake. An end-of-year festival featuring a cookout and strawberry shortcake.

== Connections with other Friends schools ==
The former nearby Thornton Friends School, named after former Sandy Spring Friends Head of School C. Thornton Brown, traced its roots to an innovative academic program, the “Interlocking Curriculum,” that was first developed at SSFS in 1973.

Sandy Spring Friends School annually sends students to the Quaker Youth Leadership Conference (QYLC) which connects students from Quaker schools across the country on the basis of leadership, community, and Quaker traditions. SSFS last hosted the QYLC in 2023.

Prior to the COVID-19 pandemic, Sandy Spring Friends School hosted an annual "Friendly Dance Exchange", which was spearheaded by then-faculty member, Hannah Kerr. Along with Sidwell Friends School and the Friends School of Baltimore, the dance programs came together for a day of community building through dance and choreography workshops.

== Notable alumni ==
- John Fogarty, lead EPA counsel in the Deepwater Horizon oil spill litigation and settlements
- Josh Joplin, musician
- Amy Michelson, actress/clothing designer
- Toshi Reagon, folk/blues musician
- Robby Reider, musician
- Liz Lerman, choreographer and former SSFS dance faculty member

== See also ==
- Religious Society of Friends
- List of Friends schools
