= Bennett D. Hill =

American historian and Benedictine monk

Bennett David Hill (1934–2005) was an American historian, Benedictine monk, and author.

== Early life and education ==
Hill was born in Baltimore, Maryland, in 1934 and moved to Philadelphia, Pennsylvania when he was ten. He earned advanced degrees from Harvard University (A.M. in 1958) and Princeton University (Ph.D. in 1963).

== Career ==
Hill taught history at the University of Illinois at Urbana.

Hill was the author of English Monasteries and Their Patrons in the Twelfth Century (1968), Church and State in the Middle Ages (1970), and articles in Analecta Cisterciensia, New Catholic Encyclopedia, The American Benedictine Review and The Dictionary of the Middle Ages. He was one of the contributing editors of The Encyclopedia of World History (2001).

Among other publications Hill have made contributions to are A History of World Societies and A History of Western Society, both published in several editions.

Hill was a Fellow of the American Council of Learned Societies and served as vice president of the American Catholic Historical Association (1995–1996). A Benedictine monk of Saint Anselm's Abbey in Washington, D.C., he also taught at St. Anselm's Abbey School and was a visiting professor at Georgetown University.
