= Melvin J. Berman Hebrew Academy =

Berman Hebrew Academy
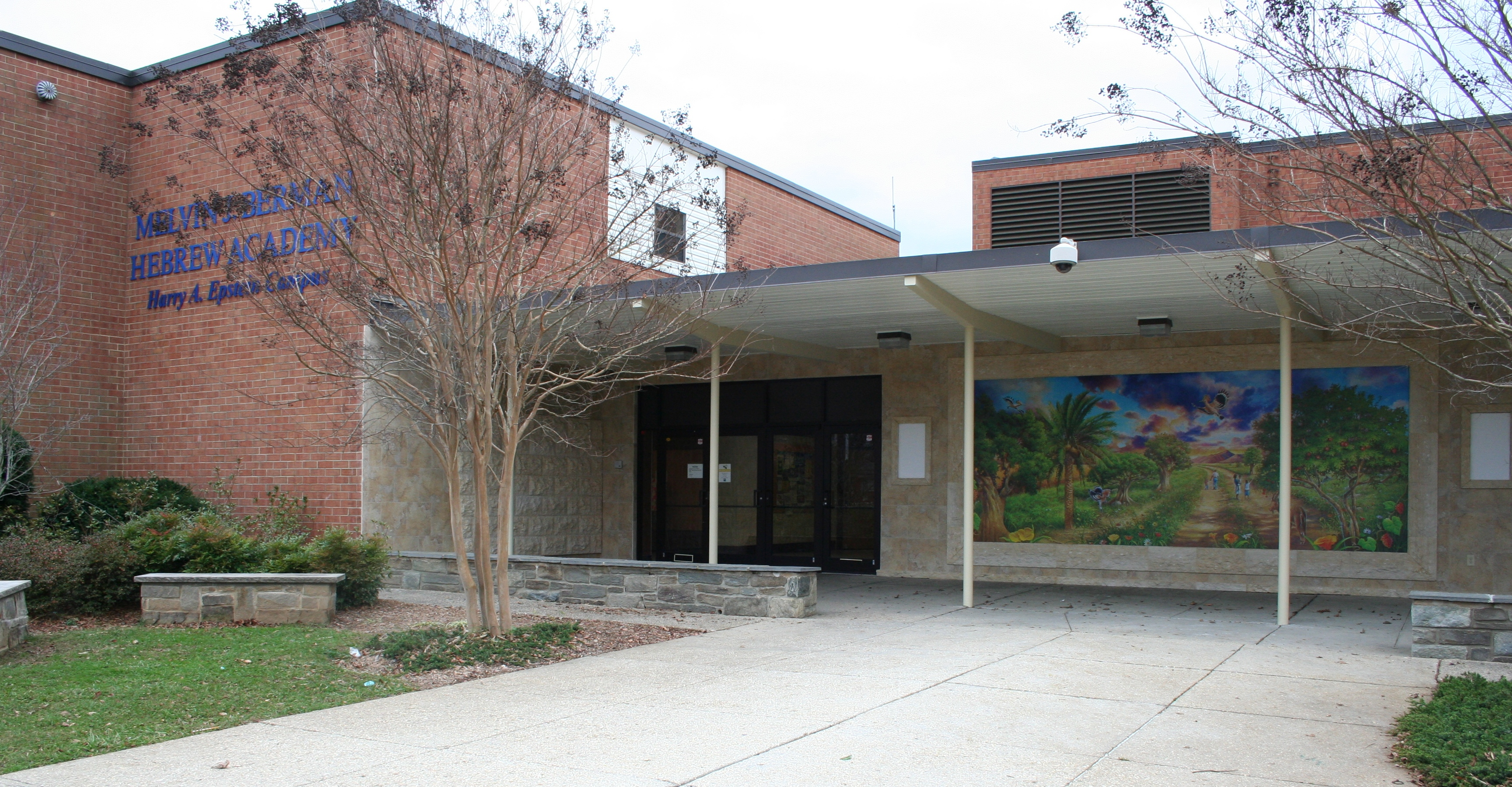
- Front Entrance

Location
- 13300 Arctic Ave; Aspen Hill (Rockville address), Maryland; United States; 39°4′25″N 77°6′1″W

Information
- Type: Private
- Established: 1944
- Locale: Residential area
- Headmaster: Rabbi Dr. Hillel Broder
- Grades: 2N-12
- Colors: Blue, orange and white
- Athletics: Cougars
- Website: www.bermanhebrewacademy.org

The Melvin J. Berman Hebrew Academy, referred to locally as Berman or The Hebrew Academy, is an American coeducational Jewish Modern Orthodox day school serving the greater Washington area. It is in Aspen Hill, Maryland, with a Rockville postal address.

The school has grades from Pre-K to 12. It was founded in 1944. The school moved to its current location in Aspen Hill in 1999, site of the former Robert E. Peary High School. It changed its name from the Hebrew Academy of Greater Washington to its current name after its benefactor Melvin J. Berman in the process. The student body consists of roughly 700 students, including about 190 in the Upper School. There were about 200 students in the 2014-2015 school year. The school has a dual curriculum including secular subjects and judaics, with the school day generally split in order to cover both curricula. The NETA program serves as the Hebrew language curriculum for the school. As of 2024, the high school is ranked as one of the top 40 Jewish high schools in the nation.

== History ==
The Hebrew Academy was founded in 1944 at 1202 Decatur Street, NW Washington, D.C., by a group of Orthodox Jewish leaders and was one of the first Jewish Day Schools founded outside of the greater New York area. As the school has expanded in size, it has moved several times before arriving at its current location in Rockville.

== Administration ==
The Berman Hebrew Academy is split into four main sections. The Pre-school is directed by Rebecca Gautieri. The Lower School, grades kindergarten to five, is run by Suzy Israel. The Middle School, from grades six to eight, is run by Dr. Shira Loewenstein, replacing Rabbi Shields. Finally, the High School recently hired a new principal, Rabbi Allan Houben, to replace the former principal Malka Popper. Rabbi Dr. Hillel Broder took over as head of school the summer of 2023 from Rabbi Dr. Yossi Kastan who began with the 2018-2019 school year. Rabbi Dr Kastan replaced Dr. Joshua Levisohn.

== Subjects ==
Grades 1, 2, and 3 consist of two classes: General (English) Studies and Jewish (Hebrew) Studies. Beginning with grade 4, there are four classes: English, Chumash, Hebrew and Navi. In grade five, there are five classes: English, Hebrew, Chumash, Navi and Mishnah. Middle and Upper school students take nine classes. Most students take English, History, Math, Science, Chumash, Navi, Talmud, Hebrew language, and an elective.

== Extra-curricular programs ==
There are many extracurricular programs and clubs available at the Berman Hebrew Academy including mock trial, Model United Nations, Hamodiya newspaper, Hebrew Academy Dramatic Arts Society (HADAS), debate team, student council, Math leagues, a cappella, Girl Up, Israel action committee, medical ethics club, engineering club, rock climbing, coding club, slam poetry club, finance club, robotics team, and more.

=== Robotics ===
Berman Hebrew Academy boasts both a middle school and high school robotics team. The middle school uses LEGO robotics and participates in FIRST LEGO League. The high school has a VEX robotics team, which participated in the Center for Initiatives in Jewish Education league this year. In its first year, the high school team won second place in its winter competition.

=== Athletics ===
The MJBHA fields cross-country, soccer, basketball, track and field, baseball, and volleyball teams. The teams compete in the Potomac Valley Athletic Conference, the ISBVL for boys volleyball.

=== Mission to Israel ===
Starting in 2004, every four years the entire Berman Upper School is brought to Israel for a ten-day long trip. The trip is meant to both connect the students to the land of Israel, some of whom may never have been before, and encourage students to "go to Israel for the year after high school and beyond."

== Logo ==
The Melvin J. Berman Hebrew Academy changed its logo and school colors from blue and yellow to blue and orange. This new logo which emphasizes a big "Berman" is meant to reflect, according to the Berman Hebrew Academy website, their "enthusiasm at being the Modern Orthodox Day School of the Nation's Capital."

== Notable alumni and faculty ==
- Ari Shaffir
- Shlomo Gaisin
- H. David Kotz
- Yehuda Kurtzer
- Dov Lipman
- Earl Dotter, photography teacher
