= Edward A. Pace =

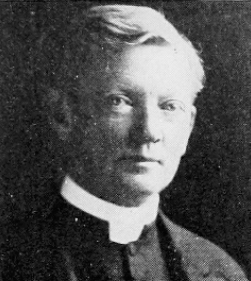
- Born: July 3, 1861; Starke, Florida, U.S.
- Died: April 26, 1938 (aged 76); Washington, D.C., U.S.
- Occupation: Clergyman

Edward Aloysius Pace (July 3, 1861 – April 26, 1938) was a Roman Catholic priest of the Diocese of St. Augustine, Florida. The first native Floridian to be ordained a diocesan priest, Pace was a theologian and a philosopher, and a professor of psychology at the Catholic University of America.

== Biography ==
Edward A. Pace was born in Starke, Florida, on July 3, 1861, the oldest of eight children of George Edward and Margaret (Kelly) Pace.

He did his doctoral work in psychology in Germany with Wilhelm Wundt in Leipzig. He wrote his dissertation on Herbert Spencer and evolution and received his PhD in 1891.

Pace was extensively involved with the early development of The Catholic University of America. He was the first professor of psychology at CUA, and established a department of psychology and psychology laboratory at CUA. He was the founding dean of its School of Philosophy. He held several administrative positions throughout his career, and was involved with many of the university's academic initiatives.

He participated actively in professional activities, attending professional gatherings, reading papers, and writing reports and book reviews for various types of publications. Between 1907 and 1912 he was one of the leading editors of the fifteen-volume Catholic Encyclopedia completed in 1914. In addition, Pace contributed to the founding of Trinity College, Washington, D.C.

In 1892 he became one of the first five psychologists elected to the American Psychological Association by its charter members. He was co-founder of the American Philosophical Association (1893), cofounder of the Catholic Philosophical Association (1926), co-founder and first editor of Catholic Educational Review (1911), cofounder and coeditor of the journal New Scholasticism (1926). He was appointed by President Hoover to the National Advisory Committee on Education in 1926.

Pace retired from CUA in 1935. He died at Providence Hospital in Washington, D.C., on April 26, 1938. After his death, Monsignor Edward Pace High School was established in Opa Locka, Florida.

== Sources ==
- Biographical Note and Finding Aid to his papers at The Catholic University of America.
- William P. Braun, Monsignor Edward A. Pace: Educator and Philosopher (Unpublished diss., The Catholic University of America, 1969).
- Charles A. Hart, ed., Aspects of the New Scholastic Philosophy: By the Associates and Former Pupils of Dr. Edward A. Pace, Vice Rector of the Catholic University of America (Benziger 1932).
- Benedict Neenan, Thomas Verner Moore: Psychiatrist, educator and monk, at 64-69 (Paulist 2000).
- C. Joseph Nuesse, The Catholic University of America: A centennial history (CUA Press 1990).
- Thomas E. Woods Jr., The Church Confronts Modernity: Catholic intellectuals and the progressive era (Columbia University Press 2004).
- C. Kevin Gillespie, S.J., Psychology and American Catholicism: From Confession to Therapy? (New York: Crossroad Publishing Company, 2001).
