= Digital Pioneers Academy =

Southeast, Washington D.C. high school

Coordinates: 38.8807°N 76.9906°W

Information
- School type: Charter school
- Established: 2018; 8 years ago
- Grades: 6-12
- Website: digitalpioneersacademy.org

The Digital Pioneers Academy is an information technology-focused high school in Southeast, Washington D.C.

== School structure ==
The free public charter school is led by Mashea Ashton, the founder and Chief Executive Officer. The school is focused on teaching students modern technology and innovation. Most of the students are from the under-resourced areas east of the Anacostia River in Wards 7 and 8; spaces at the school are awarded via a lottery system.

The school enrolls over 600 students in grades 6-12.

The school has two campuses, the Capitol Hill campus serves students in Eighth grade to Tenth grade.

== History ==
The school was founded in 2018.

The school was the target of telephone bomb threat in February 2022.

English teacher Keenan Anderson died in January 2023 while visiting family in Los Angeles, after being repeatedly tasered by Los Angeles Police Department while being arrested.
