= St. Anselm's Abbey School =

Location
- 4501 South Dakota Avenue, NE; Washington, D.C. 20017; United States; 38°56′46″N 76°59′11″W

Information
- Type: Private, selective, all-male
- Motto: Pax in Sapientia ("Peace in wisdom")
- Religious affiliation: Roman Catholic
- Established: 1942 (84 years ago)
- School district: Archdiocese of Washington Catholic Schools
- CEEB code: 090155
- Headmaster: John Corrigan
- Chaplain: Fr. Samuel Springuel, OSB
- Faculty: 45
- Grades: Forms A - VI (grades 6–12)
- Enrollment: 255 (in 2024-25)
- Campus: Urban
- Colors: Maroon and silver
- Athletics conference: Potomac Valley Athletic Conference
- Mascot: Panther
- Accreditation: Middle States Association of Colleges and Schools
- Newspaper: The Priory Press / The Panther
- Yearbook: The Priory Perspective
- Tuition: $35,400-36,400
- Affiliations: Benedictine
- Website: www.saintanselms.org

St. Anselm's Abbey School is an all-boys preparatory school for grades six through twelve in Washington D.C., United States. It is located in the Roman Catholic Archdiocese of Washington. The school sits on a 40-acre wooded campus in the Michigan Park neighborhood of the city's Northeast quadrant. It is run by the Benedictine monks of Saint Anselm's Abbey.

== History ==
The Abbey Shield

The school was founded in 1942 as the Priory School by Fr. Thomas Verner Moore, OSB, the superior of what was then St. Anselm's Priory. The Priory School opened on September 15, 1942 with just 18 students. Although the school began as a high school, the 7th and 8th grades (known as Form I and Form II, respectively) were added in 1955.

The school was renamed St. Anselm's Abbey School in 1961, when the monastery was elevated to the status of an abbey. A 6th grade, known as Form A, was added in 1990 following a major expansion of the school's academic building. In 2003, the school completed a $9 million athletic and performing arts complex. This included the construction of a state-of-the-art athletic facility and gymnasium, as well as the conversion of the old 1945 gym into the Devine Performing Arts Center, containing classroom space, faculty offices, and a theater with seating for 400.

== Academics ==
An entrance exam is required. The school attempts to create an academically challenging curriculum that offers classes in a range of subjects, including 26 Advanced Placement courses. In 2024, roughly one-third of the graduating class achieved commendation or higher honors from the National Merit Scholar program. The average combined SAT score was over 1395. In 2025, 84% of the 37 graduates achieved the AP Scholar, AP Scholar with Distinction, or National AP Scholar level as defined by the Advanced Placement Program.

Each student who has graduated from St. Anselm's Abbey School since its founding has been accepted to and attended an accredited four-year college or university. For the three-year period from 2018 to 2020, the five most popular destinations for St. Anselm's graduates were Boston College, University of Notre Dame, the University of Maryland, College Park, the University of Virginia, and the College of William & Mary.

The school's curriculum emphasizes classics and is somewhat idiosyncratic. Grades are called "forms", in accordance with the British school system. In addition to six years of science and four years of a spoken language (either French, Spanish, or Arabic), four years of Latin are required. Ancient Greek is also offered as an elective for students in the Upper School. As in many other religious schools, theology is also a required course each year.

The school is accredited by the Middle States Association of Colleges and Schools and is a member of the National Association of Independent Schools.

In a December 2006 online discussion, Washington Post columnist and Challenge Index creator Jay Mathews said, "Saint Anselm's Abbey in NE D.C. has one of the highest ratings in the country, far above most private schools I know." Following up in June 2011, Mathews declared that had he included private schools on his "Challenge Index", St. Anselm's Abbey School would have "a rating of 7.250 and a national ranking of 27th if [he] put it on the list. On the Washington area list it would have been No. 1."

The Baltimore Sun has called St. Anselm's "one of the country's premier college preparatory schools." In August 2017, Town & Country listed St. Anselm's as one of the top 10 Catholic high schools in the country.

Class sizes are 10-20 per class. The school's student-to-faculty ratio is 6:1. Classes are smallest in the Upper Division (Forms V and VI), and graduating classes are typically made up of 40 or fewer students.

== Campus and facilities ==
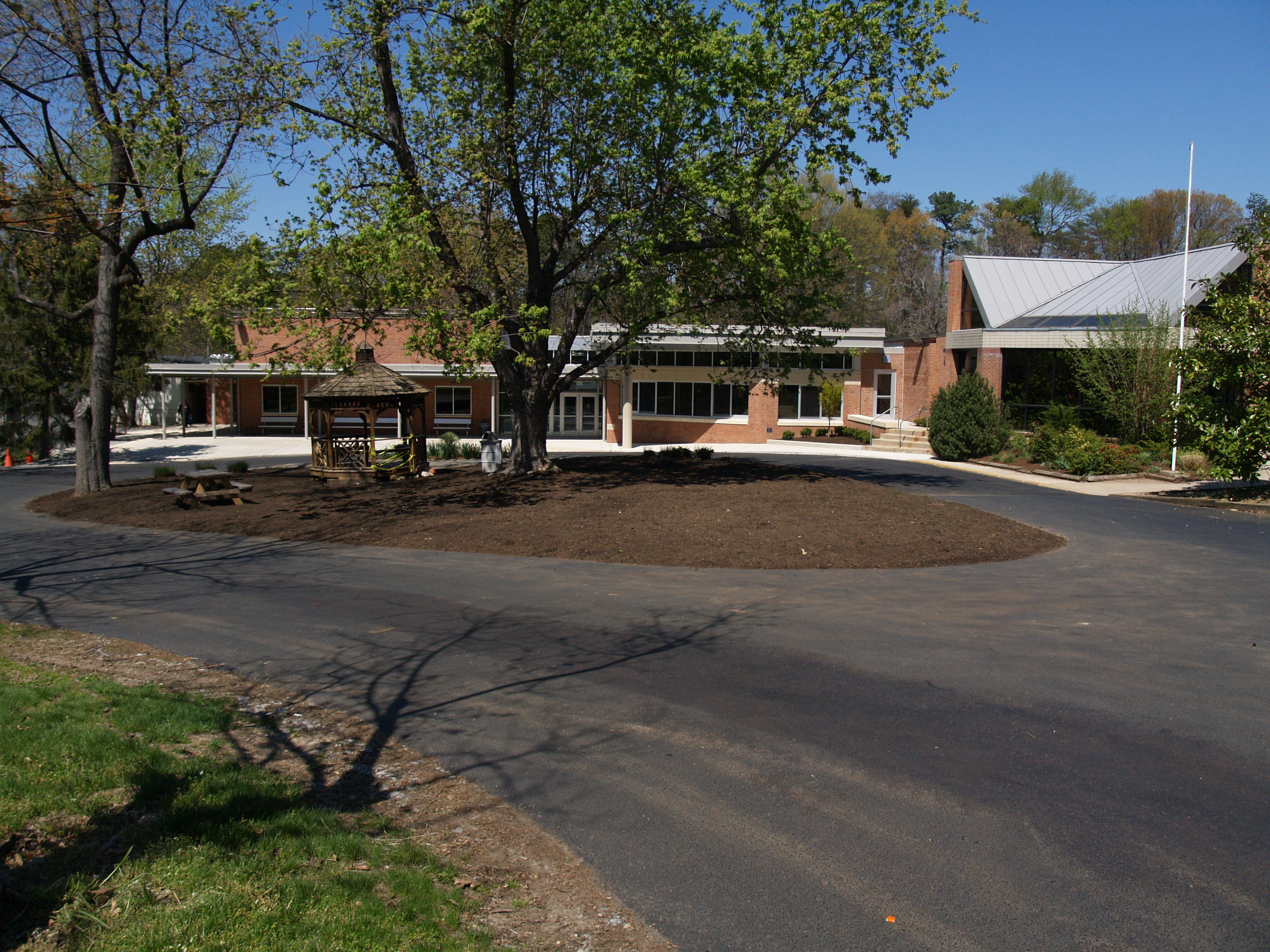
The St. Anselm's academic building

The school's campus is approximately 40 acres (16 ha) atop a hill in Washington, D.C., and includes the monastic building of St. Anselm's Abbey, an academic building, and an athletics/performing arts complex. The campus contains several tennis courts, athletic fields, batting cages, a cemetery and woodland areas.

The academic building underwent a renovation in 2008. A lecture hall with a stage and multimedia capabilities was completed. An earth science lab was completed, providing more space for experimentation in the science department. With its completion, the number of labs available to students is four, one for each of the major sciences. The largest and most noticeable upgrade is to the school entrance, which now has a new reception area and office space for student-teacher consultations. The rest of the school also received technological upgrades, including the installation of SMART Boards in most classrooms.

== Athletics ==
St. Anselm's competes in the Potomac Valley Athletic Conference at the middle school and varsity levels in several sports each season. In the school's history, the Panthers have won 81 conference championships in basketball, soccer, baseball, tennis, cross country, swimming, and track and field.

St. Anselm's has hosted the longest-running high school basketball tournament in the Washington, D.C., metropolitan area. The St. Anselm's Invitational has been a tradition at the school since 1948.

== Student life ==
The It's Academic team is nationally ranked, with members often participating in televised quiz bowl tournaments hosted at various schools.

The high school newspaper, The Priory Press, and the yearbook, the Priory Perspective, are student-run and contributed to by the junior and senior classes. The Panther, the middle school newspaper, is also student-run.

== Notable alumni ==
- Michael Craig-Martin, 1959 – London-based conceptual artist and painter
- John T. Elson, 1949 – former religion editor and writer at Time magazine
- Brian K. Devine, 1959 – current chairman of the board and former CEO of Petco
- Morgan E. O'Brien, 1962 – co-founder and former chairman of Nextel; telecommunications pioneer
- Xavier Suarez, 1967 – first Cuban-born mayor of Miami
- Mark S. Smith, 1973 – Biblical scholar and professor at New York University
- Hans van Mourik Broekman, 1984 - former Principal of Liverpool College (UK)

=== Notable faculty ===
- Fr. Benet Hill, OSB, former theology and social studies teacher
- Fr. John Main, OSB, fifth Headmaster, 1970–1974 – leader in the field of Christian meditation
- William E. May, former Theology teacher – moral theologian
- John Montroll, former Calculus and origami teacher – author of many books on origami
- Fr. David Granfield, OSB, former theology teacher – Canon lawyer and law professor

== See also ==
- Saint Anselm
- Saint Anselm's Abbey
