= The Field School =

Preparatory school in Washington, D.C.

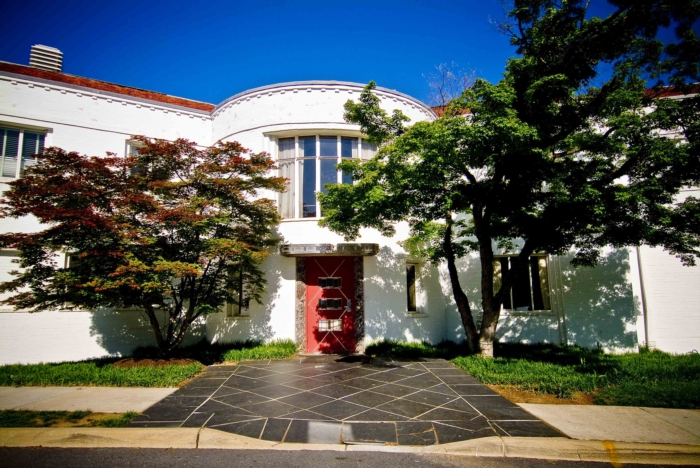
- The Cafritz Building entrance (2011)

Location
- 2301 Foxhall Rd NW; Washington, D.C. 20007; United States; 38°55′17″N 77°05′19″W

Information
- Type: Independent school
- Motto: Aude Sapere (Dare to Know)
- CEEB code: 090073
- Head of school: Lori Strauss
- Teaching staff: 56.5 (FTE)
- Grades: 6–12
- Enrollment: 368
- Student to teacher ratio: 6.5
- Campus size: 10.5 acres
- Colors: Blue and gold
- Athletics conference: Potomac Valley Athletics Conference (PVAC)
- Mascot: Falcon
- Tuition: Middle School (grades 6-8) $56,295, Upper School: (grades 9-12) $57,935
- Website: www.fieldschool.org

The Field School is an independent, co-ed, grades 6–12 preparatory school in Washington, D.C. The campus includes three buildings: the Aude Building, the Sapere Building, and the historic Cafritz House on Foxhall Road. Field serves 370 students as of the 2025–2026 school year.

== Notable alumni ==
- Zach Cregger (class of 1998)
- Rachel Grady (class of 1990)
- Josh Harris (class of 1982)
- Jennifer Herrema (class of 1985)
- Courtney Hunt (class of 1982)
- Spike Jonze, photographer, filmmaker, director and actor
- Nathan Larson
- Justin Theroux, screenwriter, director, actor and film producer
- Craig Wedren (class of 1987)
