= Robert Headen =

American football player (born 1939)

Robert "Bob" Headen
- Born: November 26, 1939 (age 86); Washington, D.C.
- Education: B.S. in Health and Physical Education from St. Augustine's College
- Alma mater: St. Augustine's College
- Occupations: Former American football player and coach
- Known for: Denver Broncos running back, Coaching career in DC Public School System
- Spouse: Gail Headen
- Children: 2 children, 3 step-children

Robert "Bob" Headen (born November 26, 1939) is a third generation Washingtonian and former Denver Broncos running back in the American Football League. He retired from the District of Columbia Public School System after 40 years of services as athletics director, dean of students, teacher and coach in 2004. Coach Headen is considered a pioneer in developing girls' basketball in D.C., as well as the architect of Washington's most dominant program. He took over as Howard D. Woodson High School's girls basketball coach two years after the passage of Title IX—legislation that barred gender discrimination at schools that receive federal funds.

Headen is the winningest Football Coach in the history of D.C. public schools. Eighteen of his former players have been drafted in the National Football League (NFL). On June 26, 1996, he was the first African-American and the first Washington D.C. inductee into the National High School Coaches Association.

== Personal life ==
Robert Headen was an only child to Ethel, a housekeeper at a downtown hotel. He grew up near 17th Street and Kalorama Road Northwest in Washington, D.C and began playing sports at several boys clubs throughout the city. He developed his football, basketball and baseball skills on the playground. By his senior year at Cardozo High School, he was a three sport starter. Headen played for coach Sal Hall. Upon graduating, he went on to star in both football and basketball at St. Augustine's College in Raleigh, North Carolina. It was there he earned his B.S. degree in Health and Physical Education. While attending, he was inducted into Who's Who Among Students in American Colleges and Universities and Kappa Alpha Psi fraternity. He was also selected All-CIAA Running Back of the Year in 1962. Headen spent the 1963 preseason with the Denver Broncos as a defensive back before returning to Washington.

Coach Headen resides in Washington, D.C., with his wife, Gail. He has 2 children and 3 step-children, three of whom graduated from D.C. public schools, and two grandchildren.

== Coaching career ==
=== Cardozo High School ===
==== Varsity Football ====
Headen accepted a teaching assignment at Cardozo in 1964, his alma mater. From the very beginning of his coaching career, he stressed to his players the importance of discipline, dedication, preparation and teamwork as the building blocks of success, both on the athletic field and in life. In 1968, Headen led Cardozo High School to the first of his record eight D.C. Interscholastic Athletic Association football championships.

Year	Champion	Runner-up	Score
1968	Cardozo	McKinley Tech	24-19

=== Howard D. Woodson High School ===
After three seasons at Cardozo, Headen left coaching for a few months before taking a teaching job at H.D. Woodson in 1972. Over four decades, he served as a teacher, football, girls softball and basketball coach, dean of students, and the Athletics Director, at one time or another. Coming on board as an assistant football coach at Woodson under head coach John Thompson (not the former Georgetown basketball coach), on the second day of practice, Headen arrived to find Thompson had taken another job. Headen became H.D. Woodson's second coach in as many days and stayed from 1972 until his retirement from football in 1999. He remained the girls' basketball coach until his official retirement in 2004. As for football, John Thompson never played a league game before his departure from Woodson, therefore Coach Headen is given the unique distinction of being the first head coach of the H.D. Woodson football team.

==== Varsity Football ====
Coach Headen retired in 1999 as H.D. Woodson's head football coach. After winning seven city football championships, Headen's vigorous work along the sideline was a trademark for H.D. Woodson. He guided his teams to an unprecedented eight D.C. Interscholastic Athletic Association championships, one with Cardozo and seven with Woodson. Over the years, his career record was 284-89.

Year	Champion	Runner-up	Score
1975	H.D. Woodson	Dunbar	14-0
1981	H.D. Woodson	Theodore Roosevelt	7-6
1982	H.D. Woodson	Coolidge	33-0
1985	Coolidge	H.D. Woodson	35-6
1986	Coolidge	H.D. Woodson	32-13
1987	H.D. Woodson	Coolidge	21-6
1993	H.D. Woodson	Anacostia	14-12
1994	H.D. Woodson	Anacostia	6-0
1997	H.D. Woodson	Anacostia	26-22

===== Students First =====
One of the first rules Coach Headen taught his assistants was they were not to yell at a player until they knew something about him or her—like whether they had had anything to eat that day or what things were like for them at home. From the start of his career at Woodson, he always wanted to know what was going on with each player.

====== Homeless Student ======
Each day after practice, Headen ran a carpool. One of his students was homeless and didn't want his teammates to know. Instead of dropping the player off at the homeless shelter, Coach Headen dropped him off at a fast-food restaurant a couple of blocks away. "Here you go, just in time to go to work," Headen would say. As Headen pulled out of the parking lot, the player would go through the restaurant, out the back door to the shelter.

====== Raymond "World" Smith ======
In 1984 Coach Headed discovered a 6-foot-6, 435-pound Woodson student named Raymond "World" Smith. Smith wanted to play football, but there were no uniform pants large enough to fit him. He was the biggest high school player in the world. Coach Headen cut two sets of uniform pants in half and sewed them together. He also noticed Smith ate lunch alone in a corner of the cafeteria. Smith was too quiet and no one was taking the time to get to know him. Headen got two female students go talk to him during lunch, other students began to quickly followed suit. World went on to play football at Grambling State University.

====== Byron Leftwich ======
Coach Headen was an advocate ball runner, until he recognized Byron Leftwich's ability to throw the ball. "I watched him practice with the JV one day, and he threw the ball back to a kid 40 yards or so on a frozen rope," Headen said. "That's the day I asked him to play on the varsity." After pleading with Leftwich to play varsity, because Leftwich didn't want to overshadow the more experienced players ahead of him and being content with a receiver position, Leftwich became the most celebrated quarterback in HD Woodson's history. Headen even installed a West Coast offense to take advantage of Leftwich's passing skills. Leftwich went on to play at Marshall University and was drafted in the NFL by Jacksonville Jaguars in 2003.

===== Retiring From Football =====
Coach Headen originally announced his retirement from football in December for 1997 after 25 years as head coach at H.D. Woodson. However, because he was also the Athletic Director for the school, he was responsible for finding his own replacement. Since he could not find the "right person" for the job, Headen decided to continue coaching.

A part of Coach Headen's decision to retire was because he was exhausted from being the only coach available to run daily practices. Upon learning of his decision, two former Woodson players joined the Woodson staff as assistant coaches. One, Kevin Robbins, had played from 1989 to 1991 as an offensive lineman for the Cleveland Browns and Los Angeles Rams in the NFL. Headen didn't officially retire from football until 1999 when he replaced himself with Coach Gregory Fuller who has continued the winning tradition at Woodson with six DCIAA Championships of his own as of 2016.

===== NFL draft =====
Coach Headen is the only coach that has won football championships in both the East and West. At the end of his career, Headen had a total of 18 players drafted into the NFL from Woodson and Cardozo.

Athlete	School	Class	Coach	Position	Drafted	Free Agent	Signed By
Tim Baylor	Cardozo	1971	Bob Headen	Defensive Back	1976		Baltimore Colts
Willie Gartrell	Cardozo	1971	Bob Headen	?	1976		Chicago Bears
Leonard Kennedy	Cardozo	?	Bob Headen	?	?		Baltimore Colts
Gregory Brown	H.D. Woodson	1976	Bob Headen	Defensive End Tackle	1981		Philadelphia Eagles
Dwayne Pugh	H.D. Woodson	1981	Bob Headen	Fullback	1986		Tampa Bay Buccaneers
Derrell Marshall	H.D. Woodson	1984	Bob Headen	Offensive Tackle	1989		Buffalo Bills
Kevin Robbins	H.D. Woodson	1984	Bob Headen	Offensive Lineman	1989		Los Angeles Rams
Damien Russell	H.D. Woodson	1987	Bob Headen	Defensive Back	1992		San Francisco 49ers
Orlando Brown	H.D. Woodson	1988	Bob Headen	Tackle		1993	Cleveland Browns
Austin Robbins	H.D. Woodson	1990	Bob Headen	Defensive Tackle	1994		Los Angeles Raiders
Jose White	H.D. Woodson	1990	Bob Headen	Defensive Tackle	1995		Minnesota Vikings
Marcus Spriggs	H.D. Woodson	1994	Bob Headen	Defensive Tackle	1999		Cleveland Browns
Giradie Mercer	H.D. Woodson	1997	Bob Headen	Defensive Line	2002		New York Jets
Byron Leftwich	H.D. Woodson	1998	Bob Headen	Quarterback	2003		Jacksonville Jaguars
Josh Morgan	H.D. Woodson	2003	Greg Fuller Bob Headen	Receiver Kick Return	2008		San Francisco 49ers
Dominique Harris	H.D. Woodson	2005	Greg Fuller Bob Headen	Defensive Back		2010	Buffalo Bills
Eddie McGee	H.D. Woodson	2006	Greg Fuller Bob Headen	Wide Receiver		2011	Oakland Raiders
Tavon Wilson	H.D. Woodson	2007	Greg Fuller Bob Headen	Defensive Back	2012		New England Patriots

===== Out of Retirement =====
Coach Headen always took the position of helping others achieve their goals. Though Woodson alumni didn't agree with his position, Coach Headen belonged to Woodson. Despite what others thought, In 2010, Headen came out of retirement to assist Natalie Randolph, the head football coach of Calvin Coolidge Senior High School in Washington, D.C., who was believed to be the only female varsity football head coach in the nation at that time. Before taking on the job, Randolph was a special-teams MVP for the semipro D.C. Divas and under Coach Headen, had formally coached wide receivers at H.D. Woodson during the 2006-2007 season. Switching roles, head coach Randolph and assistant Coach Headen, within one year, took Coolidge from 4-7, all the way to the championship game on November 24, 2011, Coolidge lost the DCIAA Turkey Bowl to Dunbar High School.

===== Alumni Loyalty =====
Several former NFL players who played under Coach Headen and Coach Gregory Fuller have provided financial support to Woodson, including funding for championship rings and equipment. Some players provided airline tickets for the Headens and the girls' basketball team for national tournaments. Former players maintain contact with Coach Headen. The Headens permitted players to call collect, which resulted in high costs.

====== Orlando Brown ======
In 1997, the start of the DCIAA season was almost delayed because there was no money in the league's budget for the mandatory reconditioning of helmets and other equipment. Woodson was the only team not affected by the crisis. Former Woodson All-Met and NFL Player Orlando Brown donated enough money to cover the reconditioning. He also purchased championship rings for the Warriors.

====== Championship Ring Donations ======
Orlando Brown

Byron Leftwich

Josh Morgan

Tavon Wilson

====== Uniforms ======
Tavon Wilson

Orlando Brown

==== Girls' Basketball ====
Coach Headen ended his career with a record of 637-98, including two city title game championships, 17 district public school championships, 21 East Division titles, and a number one ranking in USA Today. At the time of his retirement, Headen was one of only two district teams to post victories in the girls' city title game, which pitted the DCIAA champion against the Washington Catholic Athletic Conference (WCAC) champion during his time. As of today, he and his chosen predecessor, Frank Oliver, Jr., are the only coaches in DCPS to have won back to back DCIAA championships against WCAC. Coach Headen was inducted into the first DCSAA Inaugural Hall of Fame in June 2017.

Woodson's girls' basketball team made their first appearance ranked No. 1 In USA Today's Super 25 on Jan 2, 1986.

===== Girls' Basketball DCIAA Championships =====
Year	Champion
1978	H.D. Woodson
1979	H.D. Woodson
1980	H.D. Woodson
1983	H.D. Woodson
1984	H.D. Woodson
1985	H.D. Woodson
1986	H.D. Woodson
1987	H.D. Woodson
1990	H.D. Woodson
1991	H.D. Woodson
1992	H.D. Woodson
1994	H.D. Woodson
1996	H.D. Woodson
1997	H.D. Woodson
1998	H.D. Woodson
2002	H.D. Woodson

===== Girls' Basketball City-Title/DCSAA Championships =====
Year	Champion	Runner-up	Score
1990	H.D. Woodson	O'Connell	70-53
1992	H.D. Woodson	O'Connell	46-29
1994	O'Connell	H.D. Woodson	47-35
1997	Elizabeth Seton	H.D. Woodson	64-51
1998	St. John’s	H.D. Woodson	73-35
1999	St. John’s	H.D. Woodson	54-47
2001	Elizabeth Seton	H.D. Woodson	47-43
2003	McNamara	H.D. Woodson	91-49

==== Girls' Softball ====
Coach Headen's teams won the girls' softball city championships in 1986 and 2002.

== Awards and Acknowledgements ==
Bob Headen Stadium Dedication

H.D. Woodson honored coach Headen by dedicating the school’s new stadium to him. Winning six city titles during his coaching career, he is considered one of the deans of D.C. public school football. Coach Headen is the only living person DCPS has dedicated a building to.

Coach of the Year

- National High School Coaches Association
  - Coach of the Year District II
    - Football 1983, 2002
    - Girls Basketball 1979, 1982, 1988, 1993, 1997, 1999, 2002
- District of Columbia Inter-Athletic Association
  - Coach of the Year
    - Football 1995
    - Girls Basketball 2001
- DC Coaches Association
  - Coach of the Year
    - Football 1987, 1993, 1994
    - Girls Basketball 1987, 1992, 1993, 1994
- Pigskin Club
  - Washington DC "Coach of the Year" - Football 1973, 1995
- Champion Products, Inc. Football Coach of the Year 1983
- National High School Coaches Association Girls Basketball - Coach of the Year 2005
- National High School Coaches Association
  - Coach of the Year
    - Football 2002
    - Girls Basketball 2005

Hall of Fame Inductions

- National High School Coaches Association Hall of Fame - First African-American & First Washington DC inductee, June 26, 1996
- St. Augustine College Hall of Fame Induction, March 2, 2002
- District of Columbia Coaches Association, June 11, 2005
- Washington DC Hall of Fame for Sports Induction, April 2006
- Cardozo All-Met hall of Fame 2010
- DC Retired Coaches Association Hall of Fame, 2005
- DCSAA Inaugural Hall of Fame, June 2017

Accomplishments

- Women's Basketball Coaches Association 500 Wins Club, 1998
- National Register's In Executive and Professionals - Who's Who in Education
- Varsity Football Team won the most DCIAA Championships since its conception
- Varsity Girls Basketball Team won the most DCIAA Championships since its conception
- Only coach that won Football Championships in both, East and West, Divisions in District of Columbia Interscholastic Athletic Association (DCIAA)
- Greater Washington Urban League Honoree 1998

Coaching Appearances

- Army All American Football Bowl, 2003
- Outstanding Contribution to Athletics and Community, 1995
- U.S. Army All-Star Football Bowl, 2004
- National High School All-Start Football Game, Santonto, TX, 1995
