= McKinley Technology High School Trainers =

Overview of athletics at McKinley Tech High School

McKinley Tech Trainers
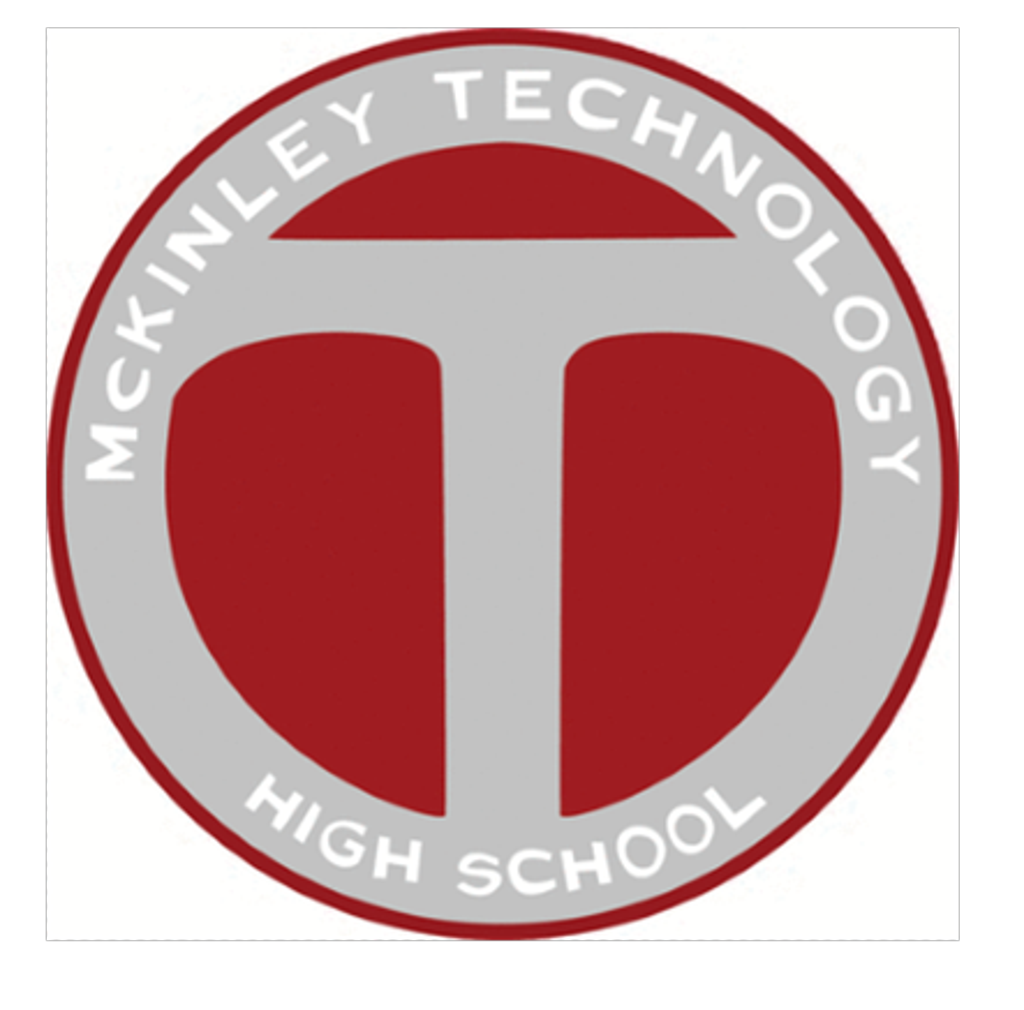
- School: McKinley Technology High School
- Nickname: Trainers
- Association: DCIAA
- Athletic director: Lashay Wilkerson
- Location: Washington, D.C.
- Varsity teams: 20
- Basketball arena: Tech Gymnasium
- Colors: Maroon and Grey
- Mascot: The Firebird

The McKinley Tech Trainers are the varsity and junior varsity interscholastic athletic teams representing McKinley Technology High School, a public secondary school located in Washington, D.C.. The school interscholastic athletics program consists of 19 varsity teams and competes in the District of Columbia Interscholastic Athletic Association. The school colors are maroon and grey, and its mascot is the Firebird.

== Sports sponsored ==
The McKinley Tech athletic department sponsors 24 varsity interscholastic sports teams sanctioned by the DCIAA. The following table lists the school’s current varsity team sports, organized by season and gender.

Season	Boys' Sports	Girls' Sports	Co-ed
Fall	Cross Country; Football; Soccer	Cross Country; Soccer; Volleyball	Cheerleading
Winter	Basketball; Indoor Track and Field	Basketball; Indoor Track and Field; Bowling	
Spring	Baseball; Outdoor Track and Field	Flag football Outdoor Track and Field; Softball	Tennis; Golf

== Championships ==
McKinley Tech has historically been dominant in track and field events, a trend which continues today. Before the school was closed and reopened it had occasional success in basketball and football, with only two championship-caliber baseball teams since World War Two. The following tables summarize championship success across all active and historic varsity sports.

Sport	Championship Seasons	Runners-up Seasons
Baseball	1927, 1933, 1938	1921, 1924, 1929, 1949, 1958
Boys' Basketball	1920, 1921, 1929, 1930, **1943**, **1945**, **1950**, **1951**, **1952**, 1966, 1968, **1969**, 1977, 1994	1932, 1939, 1944, 1954, 1965
Football	1924, 1928, 1929, 1930, 1931, 1932, 1936, 1947, 1970	1919, 1922, 1940, 1942, 1946, 1949, 1950, 1966, 1968, 1969
Boys' Indoor Track & Field	2023, 2024, 2025	2026
Girls' Indoor Track & Field	2015, 2026	
Boys' Outdoor Track & Field	1918, 1925, 1926, 1927, 1928, 1933, 1934, 1935, 1936, 1942, 1961, 1967, 1978, 2018, 2022, 2023, 2024, 2025	1903, 1904, 1905, 1906, 1910, 1911, 1914, 1915, 1917, 1919, 1922, 1923, 1929, 1937, 1938, 1940, 1941, 1944, 1945, 1956, 1968, 1976, 1977, 1980, 2017, 2026
Girls' Outdoor Track & Field	1980	1976, 1981, 1982, 2012, 2017
Total		

Bold indicates city champion.

== Notable alumni ==
=== Major League Baseball (MLB) ===
Major League Baseball (MLB)
Name	Class	Position	MLB Teams	Years active
Boze Berger	1928	2B, SS, 3B	Cleveland Indians, Chicago White Sox, Boston Red Sox	1932-1939
Red Webb	1947	P	New York Giants	1948-1949
Billy Werber	1926	SS, 3B, LF	New York Yankees, Boston Red Sox, Philadelphia Athletics, Cincinnati Reds, New York Giants	1930-1942

=== National Basketball Association (NBA) ===
National Basketball Association (NBA)
Name	Class	Position	NBA Teams	Years active
Tim Bassett	1969	PF/C	San Diego Conquistadors, New York Nets, San Antonio Spurs	1973-1980
John Battle	1981	SG	Atlanta Hawks, Cleveland Cavaliers	1985-1995
Bill Martin	1981	SF	Los Angeles Lakers	1985-1987
Anthony Tucker	1987	SF	Washington Bullets	1994

=== National Football League (NFL) ===
National Football League (NFL)
Name	Class	Position	NFL Teams	Years active
Andy Davis	1945	DB	Washington Redskins	1952
Freddie Jones	1992	TE	San Diego Chargers, Arizona Cardinals	1997-2004
Lonnie Perrin	1972	RB	Denver Broncos, Washington Redskins, Chicago Bears	1976-1979
Eric Washington	1968	DB	St. Louis Cardinals	1972-1973

=== Olympians ===
Olympians
Name	Class	Sport	Games competed
Arthur Cook	1946	50 m rifle prone	1948 London
