= H. D. Woodson High School =

Howard D. Woodson High School
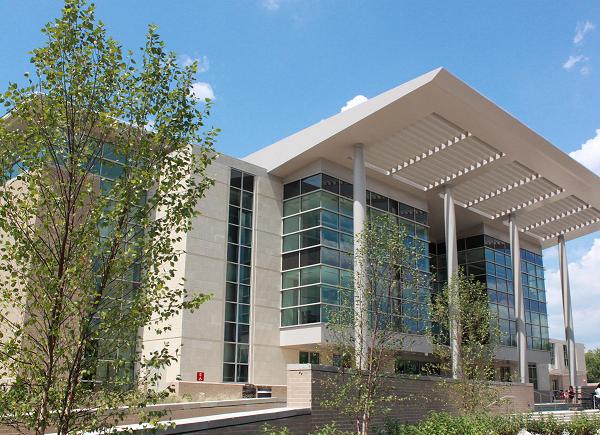

Location
- 540 55th St. NE; Washington D.C. 20019; United States; 38°53′48″N 76°55′22″W

Information
- School type: Public high school
- Motto: Latin: Haec olim meminisse juvabit (In days to come, it will please us to remember this)
- Established: 1972 (54 years ago)
- Status: Open
- School board: District of Columbia State Board of Education
- School district: District of Columbia Public Schools
- NCES District ID: 1100030
- School number: DC-001-464
- CEEB code: 090086
- NCES School ID: 110003000055
- Principal: William E. Massey
- Faculty: 42.50 (on an FTE basis)
- Grades: 9–12
- Enrollment: 478 (2021–2022)
  - Grade 9: 193
  - Grade 10: 108
  - Grade 11: 101
  - Grade 12: 76
- Student to teacher ratio: 11.25
- Campus size: 6 acres (2.4 ha)
- Campus type: Urban
- Colors: Red, black, green
- Athletics conference: District of Columbia Interscholastic Athletic Association, District of Columbia State Athletic Association
- Nickname: African Warriors
- USNWR ranking: 13,383–17,843 (2022)
- Website: hdwoodson.org

Howard Dilworth Woodson High School (known as H. D. Woodson High School, Howard D. Woodson High School, or Woodson High School) is a secondary school in Washington, D.C. that serves grades 9 through 12. It is located in the Northeast Boundary neighborhood, at the intersection of 540 55th Street. It is a part of the District of Columbia Public Schools and primarily serves students in Ward 7. The current principal is William Massey.

== History ==
=== H. D. Woodson ===
The school is named after Howard Dilworth Woodson (1877–1962). A graduate of the University of Pittsburgh, Woodson worked for the federal government as a civil and structural engineer for many years and became a civic leader in the Far Northeast/Deanwood neighborhood, campaigning for more resources for education, redevelopment, and utility services for the area. During that time, the District of Columbia did not have an elected government. Woodson frequently testified before U.S. congressional committees for D.C. oversight.

Woodson advocated for a high school to be built in Deanwood in response to demands in the area for a local school. Since the Deanwood area had no neighborhood high school, students traveled to Eastern, Spingarn, or Anacostia high schools.

=== Early years: 55th & Eads Streets, NE ===
The new school opened in 1972 at 55th and Eads Streets NE and was named Howard Dilworth Woodson Senior High School. Described as the first high-rise high school in the country, it consisted of a seven-floor tower above a plaza and a ground floor with a greenhouse on the roof, and elevators and escalators that took students and faculty up and down the tower. Initially, the building's size and shape ran into obstacles with the planning boards. However, H.D. Woodson's son, Granville Woodson, the chief of the DCPS buildings department, argued successfully that the size and shape of the new school was precisely the point and made the school the focus of the community by appearing as significant as possible. The school resembled a modern office building with a large outside pedestrian plaza, a surface parking lot for 200 vehicles, and a stadium with track, athletic fields, and tennis courts. A student contest to create a slogan for the building resulted in the nickname "the tower of power".

When Woodson finally opened for grades 10 and 11 on September 13, 1972, it was praised as a state-of-the-art campus with a new look, equipment, and specially recruited new teachers. Inside the school there were 82 classrooms, an Olympic-sized swimming pool, a large gymnasium, health suite, dance studio, auditorium/theater, and a military armory with ROTC classroom. Between 1975 and 1979 it averaged 1,800 students per year during the day and 380 students per year at the evening community school. Students from all quadrants of the city attended the school, which was set up as a "comprehensive" high school, offering both traditional academic and vocational programs, including wood and machine shops, a drafting program, an electrical trade program, a "power mechanics" lab to study jet and rocket engines, extensive home-economics facilities, and a greenhouse. Between 1975 and 1979, Woodson had a graduation rate of 95%.

In 1986, the school held a special dedication ceremony to name its gymnasium after John P. Davis, the school's first boys' basketball coach (1972–82), died in 1984.

=== 1990–2008: Decline and lack of funding ===
The school building deteriorated due to a lack of funding as the years went by. By the 1990s, Woodson's tower "loomed over the Deanwood neighborhood became an outsized symbol of the District government's dysfunction." Instead of the custodial staff being tied to the size of the building, DCPS tied the staff to student enrollment. As the student body declined, so did the number of custodial staff members. Preventive maintenance essentially came to a halt.

With a shortage of money for maintenance, broken pipes dripped throughout the building. The escalators no longer functioned and were used as stairs. As classes changed, the administration implemented a system for students to go up the escalators and down the stairwells at every corner of the building. Woodson's pool had previously been used by the community, but by the mid-1990s, the Department of Parks & Recreation ceased contributing to the pool's maintenance, and soon after, the six-lane pool was closed.

Despite building deterioration, Woodson's athletic success continued. The closing of the school's pool did not stop the Warrior Sharks from winning the DCIAA Championship during the 1994 swim season. In a "dry-land swimming" technique, the team swam on tables using stopwatches, and the coach developed breathing and kicking techniques.

Each year, the varsity football team appeared in the annual DCIAA Turkey Bowl, winning four City Championship titles.

The school's "African Warrior" mascot was initially displayed backward, showing the buttock of the warrior. In the mid-1990s, DCPS turned the warrior to face front. Woodson is also represented by three colors: red, black, and green, representing the blood, skin, and land of black people.

=== 2008–2011: Relocation ===
Eventually, the original building was demolished in 2009 and replaced by a new three-story state-of-the-art facility in 2011. As Woodson was being demolished in 2009, ninth-graders attended Ron Brown Middle School on Meade Street Northeast. The upper-level students settled in at a former middle school in Southeast, once named Fletcher-Johnson Education Center on Benning Road.

In September 2014, during halftime at a Roosevelt v. H.D. Woodson game, the school honored coach Robert Headen by dedicating the school's new stadium to him. As head coach, he had a record of 268 wins with only 87 losses and won six city titles during his coaching career. Headen was the first high school coach from DC inducted into the National High School Coaches Association Hall of Fame and in the Washington, D.C. Hall of Fame for sports.

== Demographics ==
View source data.

Enrollment by Race/Ethnicity 2020–2021
Black	Hispanic	Two or More Races	American Indian/Alaska Native
428	3	2	1

98.9% of the students at Woodson are Black, non-Hispanic. Other students are Hispanic / Latino (0.6%), Native American / Alaska Native (0.2%), Native Hawaiian / Other Pacific Islander (0.2%), or Multiracial (0.3%).

== Curriculum ==
H.D. Woodson students can participate in the NAF program (Information Technology / Computer Science) and the STEM Academy. The school also offers various Advanced Placement courses.

Woodson offers various extracurricular activities, including a National Honor Society, NJROTC, Drill Team, and Future Business Leaders of America.

=== Hoop Dreams Scholarship Fund ===
Susie Kay founded the Hoop Dreams Scholarship Fund (HDSF) in 1996 while working as an American Government teacher at Woodson. Kay organized a one-day charity basketball tournament to raise money to assist students with college expenses, raising $3,000 for academic college scholarships. As well as scholarships, HDSF provided mentorship from DC-area professionals and college and career preparation. To get HDSF on its feet, Key searched for corporate sponsors and volunteers, and as the operation grew, she was eventually asked by DCPS to raise funds for all DC Public School students.

HDSF brought together more than 1,000 students and mentors, facilitated more than 250 internships, engaged over 1,000 volunteers in community cleanup projects, and helped more than 900 students attend college through scholarships totaling more than $3 million. Hoop Dreams shut down operations because scholarships beyond the 2009–10 academic year could not be guaranteed.

== Extracurricular activities ==
=== Athletics ===
The school's sports program is among the strongest in the DC metro area, winning multiple varsity boys' football championships and varsity boys and girls basketball championship repeats. The boys' varsity basketball team finished the 2015–16 season undefeated and won the state championship, ranking 8th in the nation.

The District of Columbia Interscholastic Athletic Association (DCIAA) is the public high school athletic league in Washington, D.C. The league was founded in 1958. The original high school conference for D.C. schools was the Inter-High School Athletic Association, formed around 1896. That organization was segregated, and black schools in the District formed their own athletic association. The Inter-High League was renamed the DCIAA in 1989 to bring the District of Columbia in line with other states' interscholastic athletic programs.

The DCIAA sponsors varsity championships in basketball, baseball, bowling, cross country, football, Flag football -girls, soccer, softball, swimming and diving, tennis, skiing, and track and field.

The District of Columbia State Athletic Association (DCSAA) was created in 2012 by D.C. Mayor Vincent Gray to expand interscholastic competition and enhance student-athlete achievement in public schools, public charter schools, and independent private and parochial schools. Prior to its creation, the DC City Title was a postseason game between DCIAA & WCAC championship winners.p

==== Boys' basketball ====
The head coach of the H.D. Woodson Warriors boys' basketball team is coach Trey Mines (2013–present). Upon Mines accepting the position, the Warriors had never won a DCIAA Basketball Championship until 2014. During the 2015–16 season, they became the first DC Public School to finish a season undefeated since 1985.

H.D. Woodson went from being unranked to No. 8 in the country after winning their second consecutive DCIAA title and first DCSAA title. Although the team wanted to continue to play at the national level, the Woodson administration declined the invitation to play in the Dick's National Tournament, which ended their season #1 in the Washington Post with a record of 33–0.

Woodson has won two DCIAA championships (2014, 2015) and has been runner-up on another occasion.

Year	Champion	Runner-up	Score
2013	Theodore Roosevelt	H.D. Woodson	77-50
2014	H.D. Woodson	Coolidge	42-36
2015	H.D. Woodson	Theodore Roosevelt	68-57

Woodson has won the DCSAA title once (2015) and finished runner-up.

Year	Champion	Runner-up	Score
2014	St. John's	H.D. Woodson	71-45
2015	H.D. Woodson	Friendship Collegiate	60-47

==== Girls' basketball ====
Coach Robert Headen has a coaching career record at Woodson of 543–59 with 14 DCIAA titles and two City Title championships. The girls' team won eight years in a row.

Woodson has won the Girls' basketball city title/DCSAA championships six times and finished runners-up on ten occasions.

Year	Champion	Runner-up	Score
1990	H.D. Woodson	O'Connell	70-53
1992	H.D. Woodson	O'Connell	46-29
1994	O'Connell	H.D. Woodson	47-35
1997	Elizabeth Seton	H.D. Woodson	64-51
1998	St. John's	H.D. Woodson	73-35
1999	St. John's	H.D. Woodson	54-47
2001	Elizabeth Seton	H.D. Woodson	47-43
2003	McNamara	H.D. Woodson	91-49
2006	Good Counsel	H.D. Woodson	62-34
2007	Holy Cross	H.D. Woodson	61-54
2008	H.D. Woodson	McNamara	61-55
2009	H.D. Woodson	Good Counsel	61-43
2010	Elizabeth Seton	H.D. Woodson	51-30
2011	St. John's	H.D. Woodson	59-44
2012	H.D. Woodson	Good Counsel	64-54
2013	H.D. Woodson	Georgetown Day	60-42

==== Softball ====
The girls' softball team won two City Championships in 1986 and 2002.

==== Swimming ====
The swimming team has won or received runner-up in the following D.C. championships:

Year	Champion
1994	H.D. Woodson

==== Track and field ====
1978 - Lady Warriors won the 1978 Penn Relay 400-meter girls' relay.

==== Football ====
The following is when the football team won or were runner-ups of the D.C. championship:

Year	Champion	Runner-up	Score
1975	H.D. Woodson	Dunbar	14-0
1981	H.D. Woodson	Theodore Roosevelt	7-6
1982	H.D. Woodson	Coolidge	33-0
1985	Coolidge	H.D. Woodson	35-6
1986	Coolidge	H.D. Woodson	32-13
1987	H.D. Woodson	Coolidge	21-6
1993	H.D. Woodson	Anacostia	14-12
1994	H.D. Woodson	Anacostia	6-0
1997	H.D. Woodson	Anacostia	26-22
2001	Dunbar	H.D. Woodson	16-14
2002	H.D. Woodson	Dunbar	19-3
2004	Dunbar	H.D. Woodson	33-0
2007	Dunbar	H.D. Woodson	20-9
2008	H.D. Woodson	Dunbar	24-6
2009	H.D. Woodson	Ballou	30-26
2010	H.D. Woodson	Dunbar	44-12
2013	H.D. Woodson	Wilson	25-13
2014	H.D. Woodson	Ballou	16-12
2015	H.D. Woodson	Wilson	40-24
2016	H.D. Woodson	Wilson	22-20
2017	Ballou	H.D. Woodson	17-14
2018	H.D. Woodson	Ballou	18-12
2019	Dunbar	H.D. Woodson	21-12

== Notable alumni ==
- Greg Brown, American football player
- Orlando Brown, American football player
- Ken Crawley, American football player
- Jamelle Elliott 2016 USA Olympic Gold Medal women's basketball coach
- Dominique Harris, American football player
- Byron Leftwich, American football player
- Josh Morgan, American football player
- Austin Robbins, American football player
- Alonzo Russell, American football player
- Damien Russell, American football player
- Marcus Spriggs, American football player
- Penny Toler American basketball player
- Jose White, American football player
- Tavon Wilson, American football player

== Notable staff ==
- Angela Winbush, music teacher, National Recording Artist
- Robert Headen, PE teacher and sports coach, First African-American, and the first Washington DC inductee into the National High School Coaches Association
