= Natalie Randolph =

Natalie Randolph is the Director of Equity, Justice & Community at Sidwell Friends School in Washington, DC and former high school football coach. She served as the head football coach at Calvin Coolidge High School in Washington, D.C. from 2010 to 2013.

As of the 2010, she was reported to be the only female head coach of a high school football team, and only the third ever to coach high school football, following Jessica Poseluzny at George Washington High School in Manhattan and Debbie Vance, at Herbert H. Lehman High School in The Bronx. Randolph received a Women of Distinction Award from the American Association of University Women and NASPA at their June 2011 National Conference for College Women Student Leaders. Randolph was recognized for breaking through barriers for women in sports.

== College athletic career ==
Randolph was a hurdler at the University of Virginia.

== Professional football ==
Randolph played wide receiver for six seasons with the DC Divas of the Independent Women's Football League, from 2003 to 2008.

== Coaching career ==
Randolph coached wide receivers at H.D. Woodson High School in Washington, D.C. from 2006 to 2007.

Randolph was named the head football coach at Coolidge High School on March 12, 2010. She coached her first game on August 27, 2010, against Archbishop Carroll, losing 28–0. The Coolidge football team rebounded to finish the year 4–7 and earn a DCIAA playoff berth. In 2011, Randolph's Coolidge team finished 7–2 and again made the DCIAA playoffs. They also reported an improvement in the teams overall grade-point average, from 2.75 to 3.0. On November 24, 2011, Coolidge lost the DCIAA Turkey Bowl to Dunbar High School.

Randolph resigned as Coolidge's coach in November 2013.
