= Dominique Harris =

American football player (born 1987)

No. 21, 42
- Position: Defensive back

Personal information
- Born: April 14, 1987 (age 39); Washington, D.C., U.S.
- Listed height: 6 ft 2 in (1.88 m)
- Listed weight: 213 lb (97 kg)

Career information
- High school: H. D. Woodson (Washington, D.C.)
- College: Temple (2005–2009)
- NFL draft: 2010: undrafted

Career history
- Buffalo Bills (2010)*; Tampa Bay Buccaneers (2010); Hamilton Tiger-Cats (2012)
- * Offseason or practice squad member only

Awards and highlights
- 2× Third-team All-MAC (2007, 2009)
- Stats at Pro Football Reference
- Stats at CFL.ca (archive)

Dominique Harris (born April 14, 1987) is an American former professional football player who was a defensive back for the Tampa Bay Buccaneers of the National Football League (NFL). He played college football for the Temple Owls. He also played for the Hamilton Tiger-Cats of the Canadian Football League (CFL).

== Early life ==
Dominique Harris was born on April 14, 1987, in Washington, D.C. He played high school football at Howard D. Woodson High School in Washington, D.C. He earned Washington Post District of Columbia Interscholastic Athletic Association (DCIAA) East honors at safety in 2005. Harris also played in the DCIAA All-Star Game and the 2004 DCIAA Turkey Bowl title game. He graduated from high school in 2005.

== College career ==
Harris attended Temple University and played college football for the Owls. He was redshirted in 2005 and was a four-year letterman from 2006 to 2009. He played in 12 games, starting seven, in 2006, recording 34 solo tackles, 25 assisted tackles, two interceptions, and four pass breakups. Harris started all 12 games at safety during the 2007 season and led the team in tackles with 81 (41 solo), pass breakups with five, and interceptions with three. He was named third-team All-Mid-American Conference (MAC) for his performance during the 2007 season. He started all 12 games at safety for the second consecutive season in 2008, totaling 42 solo tackles, 24 assisted tackles, a team-best three interceptions, and a team-best three forced fumbles, two fumbles recoveries, and three pass breakups. Harris was also a team captain during the 2008 season. He was a team captain again his senior year in 2009 and started all 13 games at safety. He finished the 2009 season with 42 solo tackles, 29 assisted tackles, 1.5 sacks, and one interception, earning third-team All-MAC, Academic All-MAC, and team MVP honors. Harris helped the 2009 Owls advance to the school's first bowl game since 1979. He graduated with a degree in criminal justice in May 2009. He wore jersey number No. 21 from 2006 to 2008 and No. 6 in 2009.

== Professional career ==
Harris was signed by the Buffalo Bills of the National Football League (NFL) on April 29, 2010, after going undrafted in the 2010 NFL draft. He was released by the Bills on September 5, 2010, and signed to the team's practice squad the next day.

On December 21, 2010, Harris was signed to the Tampa Bay Buccaneers' active roster off of the Bills' practice squad. He was inactive for one game and then played in the season finale on January 2, 2011, against the New Orleans Saints. He wore number 21 during his time with the Buccaneers. Harris was released by the Buccaneers on September 3, 2011.

Harris signed with the Hamilton Tiger-Cats of the Canadian Football League (CFL) on October 16, 2012. He dressed in three games for the Tiger-Cats during the 2012 season, recording four defensive tackles, three special teams tackles, and one interception for 31 yards. He wore number 42 with Hamilton. He became a free agent after the season.

== Post-playing career ==
Harris later served as a football operations graduate assistant with the Temple Owls.
