= Northeast Boundary =

Coordinates: 38°53′37.5″N 76°54′49.9″W

- Neighborhood of Washington, D.C.
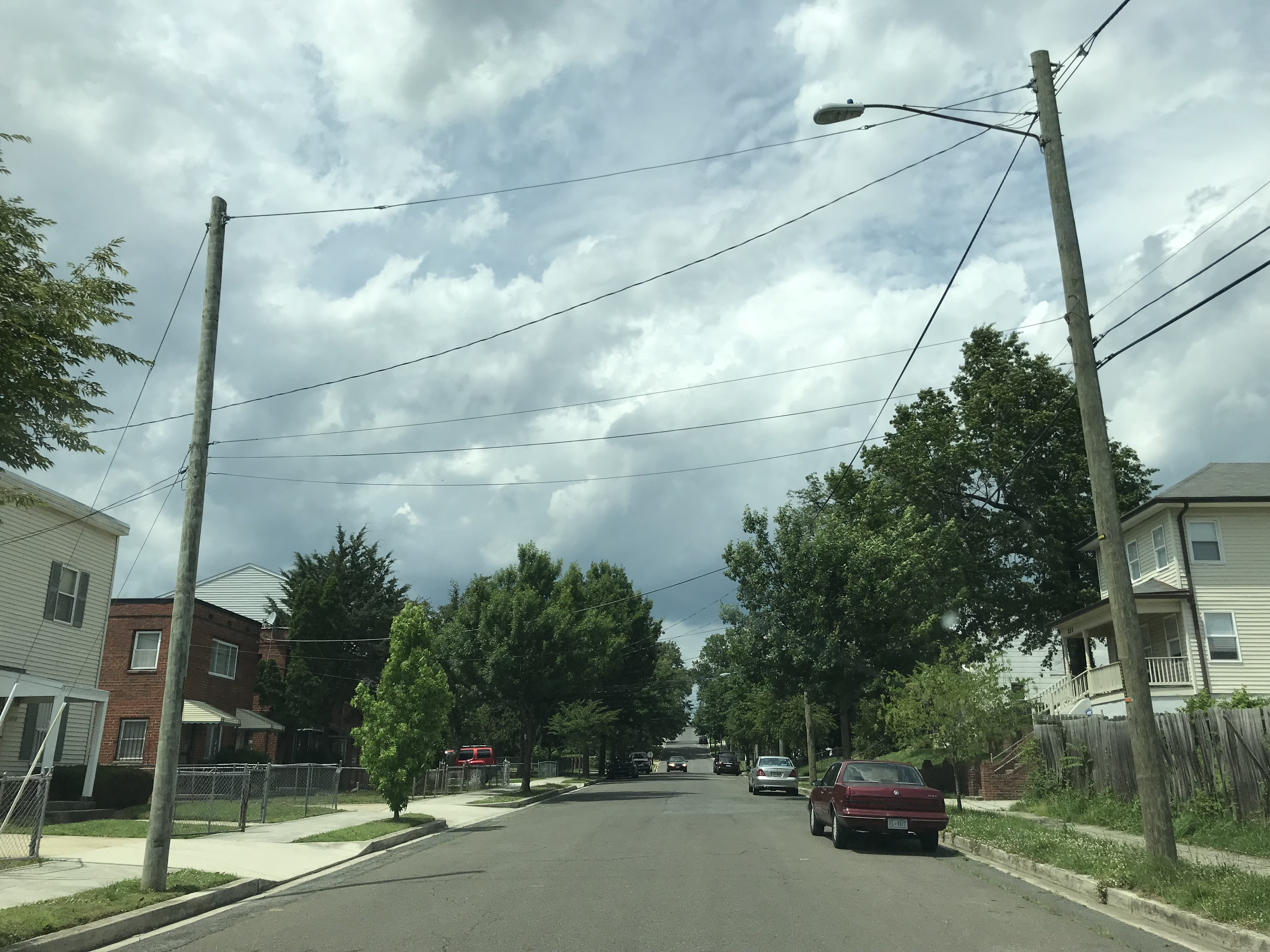
- Intersection of 60th St. and Clay St. NE, in Northeast Boundary, May 2019

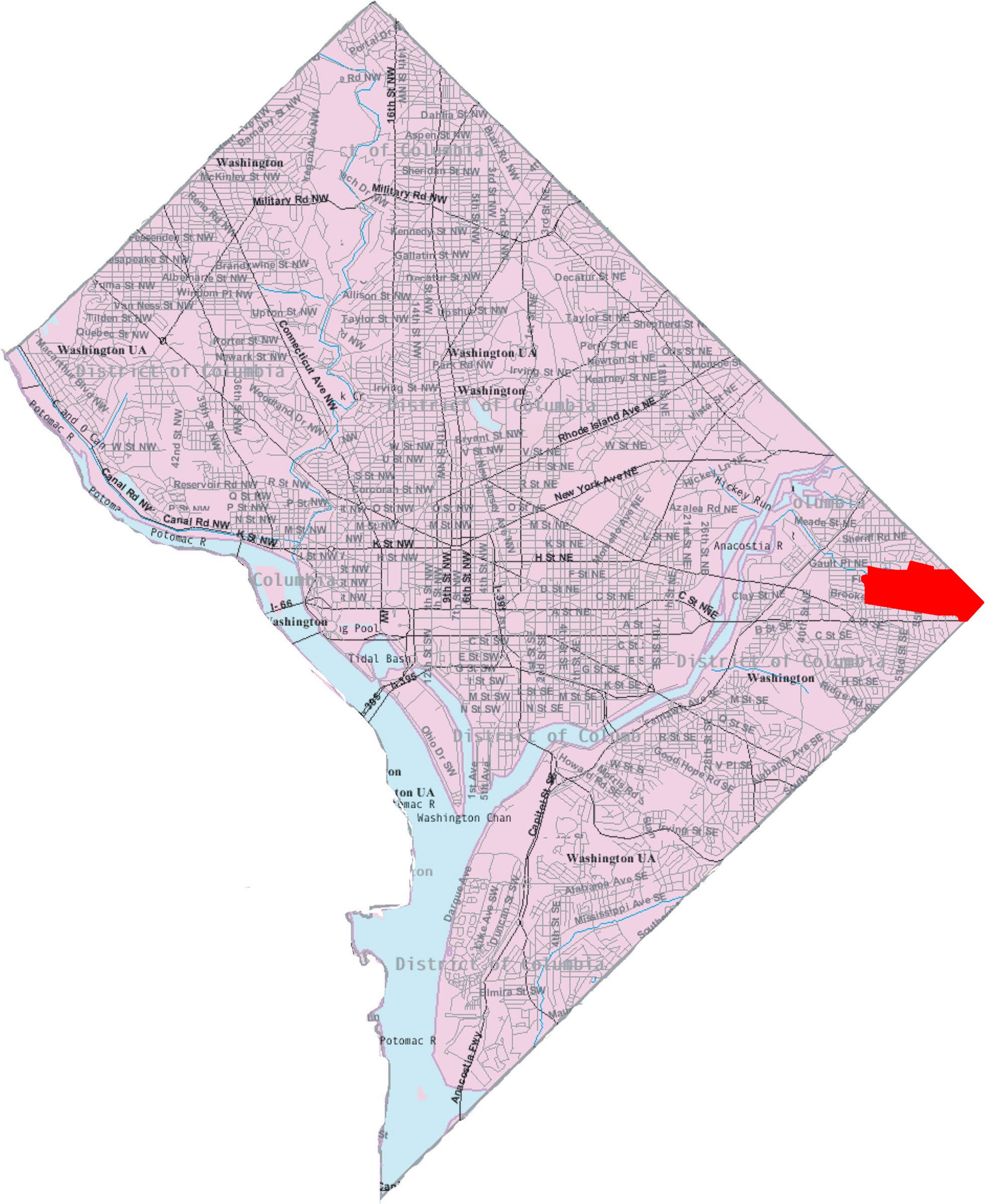
- Northeast Boundary within the District of Columbia
- Country: United States
- District: Washington, D.C.
- Ward: Ward 7

Government
  - Councilmember: Wendell Felder

Northeast Boundary is a small neighborhood located in the northeast quadrant of Washington, D.C., in the United States. Along with the Capitol View neighborhood, it is the easternmost neighborhood of the District of Columbia.

== Borders ==
The borders of Northeast Boundary also known as East Corner are 58th Street NE, Nannie Helen Burroughs Avenue NE, East Capitol Street NE, Southern Avenue NE, and Eastern Avenue NE.

Northeast Boundary immediately borders Prince George's County, Maryland, and the communities of Capitol Heights, Fairmount Heights, and Seat Pleasant.

== Economic development ==
The government of the District of Columbia includes Northeast Boundary in the Far Northeast and Southeast Area Planning Area. It is a "policy focus area", receiving special economic development, policy planning, zoning, and other attention from the district government.

Nannie Helen Burroughs Avenue NE serves as the main retail district in Northeast Boundary. Dix Street NE between 60th Street NE and Eastern Avenue NE serves as a secondary retail corridor. The District government is working to encourage infill retail development on Dix Street.

Northeast Boundary is a relatively poor neighborhood with few amenities and limited retail services. In April 2018, the District of Columbia nominated a portion of Northeast Boundary for listing as an Opportunity Zone, a federal incentive program designed to encourage business and commercial investment in low-income areas.

== Schools, parks, and Metro ==
H.D. Woodson High School and the adjacent Marvin Gaye Park are both located in the neighborhood. Two large public housing complexes exist within the community: Richardson Dwellings (5231 Cloud Place NE) and Lincoln Heights (400 50th Street NE). Watts Branch runs southeast to northeast through the neighborhood, and Watts Branch Park (bounded by Southern Avenue NE, 61st Street NE, and Banks Place NE) is considered a gateway to the neighborhood. The park includes a baseball field, basketball court, community garden, and playground. In May 2018, the $14 million ($17,900,000 in 2025 dollars) Marvin Gaye Recreation Center opened in Watts Branch Park. The two-story, 72,000 square feet (6,700 m^{2}) facility replaced the one-story Watts Branch Recreation Center.

The Capitol Heights Washington Metro station (Blue and Silver Lines) a few blocks east across the border in Maryland is the nearest subway station. The hilly terrain of the neighborhood and small scale of the street grid network has tended to inhibit Metrobus service in the neighborhood.

== Bibliography ==
- Office of Planning (2017). "Far Northeast and Southeast Area Element". The Comprehensive Plan for the National Capital: District Elements (PDF) (Report). Washington, D.C.: Government of the District of Columbia.
