= Jose White =

American football player (1973–2019)

No. 95, 93
- Position: Defensive tackle

Personal information
- Born: March 2, 1973; Washington, D.C., U.S.
- Died: October 2019 (aged 46)
- Listed height: 6 ft 3 in (1.91 m)
- Listed weight: 290 lb (132 kg)

Career information
- High school: H.D. Woodson (Washington, D.C.)
- College: Howard
- NFL draft: 1995: 7th round, 232nd overall pick

Career history
- Minnesota Vikings (1995); New York Jets (1996)*; New Orleans Saints (1996)*; Jacksonville Jaguars (1996–1998); Minnesota Vikings (1999)*; Tennessee Titans (1999)*; Buffalo Destroyers (2003)
- * Offseason or practice squad member only

Career NFL statistics
- Tackles: 32
- Sacks: 3
- Forced fumbles: 1
- Stats at Pro Football Reference
- Stats at ArenaFan.com

Jose Cornelius White (March 2, 1973 – October 2019) was an American professional football defensive tackle who played two seasons with the Jacksonville Jaguars of the National Football League (NFL). He was selected by the Minnesota Vikings in the seventh round of the 1995 NFL draft after playing college football at Howard University. White also played for the Buffalo Destroyers of the Arena Football League (AFL).

== Early life and college ==
Jose Cornelius White was born on March 2, 1973, in Washington, D.C. He attended Howard D. Woodson High School in Washington, D.C.

White played college football for the Howard Bison of Howard University.

== Professional career ==
White was selected by the Minnesota Vikings in the seventh round, with the 232nd overall pick, of the 1995 NFL draft. He officially signed with the team on July 22. He was released on September 21 and signed to the team's practice squad on September 26, 1995. White was released by the Vikings on August 20, 1996.

White was signed to the practice squad of the New York Jets on September 11, 1996. He was released on October 1, 1996.

White was signed to the New Orleans Saints' practice squad on October 31, 1996.

On December 3, 1996, the Jacksonville Jaguars signed White off of the Saints' practice squad. He was released on August 19, 1997, and re-signed on November 11, 1997. White played in three games for the Jaguars during the 1997 season, posting three solo tackles and two assisted tackles. He also appeared in one playoff game that year. He played in 15 games in 1998, recording 20 solo tackles, seven assisted tackles, three sacks, and one forced fumble. White also played in two postseason games in 1998. He became a free agent after the 1998 season and re-signed with the Jaguars on March 11, 1999. He was released on April 22, 1999.

White signed with the Vikings again on July 7, 1999, but was later waived on August 16, 1999.

White was claimed off waivers by the Tennessee Titans on August 17, 1999. He was soon released on August 31, 1999.

White signed with the Buffalo Destroyers of the Arena Football League (AFL) December 20, 2002. He was placed on injured reserve on January 18, 2003. He posted one solo tackle and one assisted tackle for the Destroyers during the 2002 season. White was an offensive lineman/defensive lineman during his time in the AFL as the league played under ironman rules.

== Personal life ==
White died in October 2019.
