= Tavon Wilson =

American football player (born 1990)

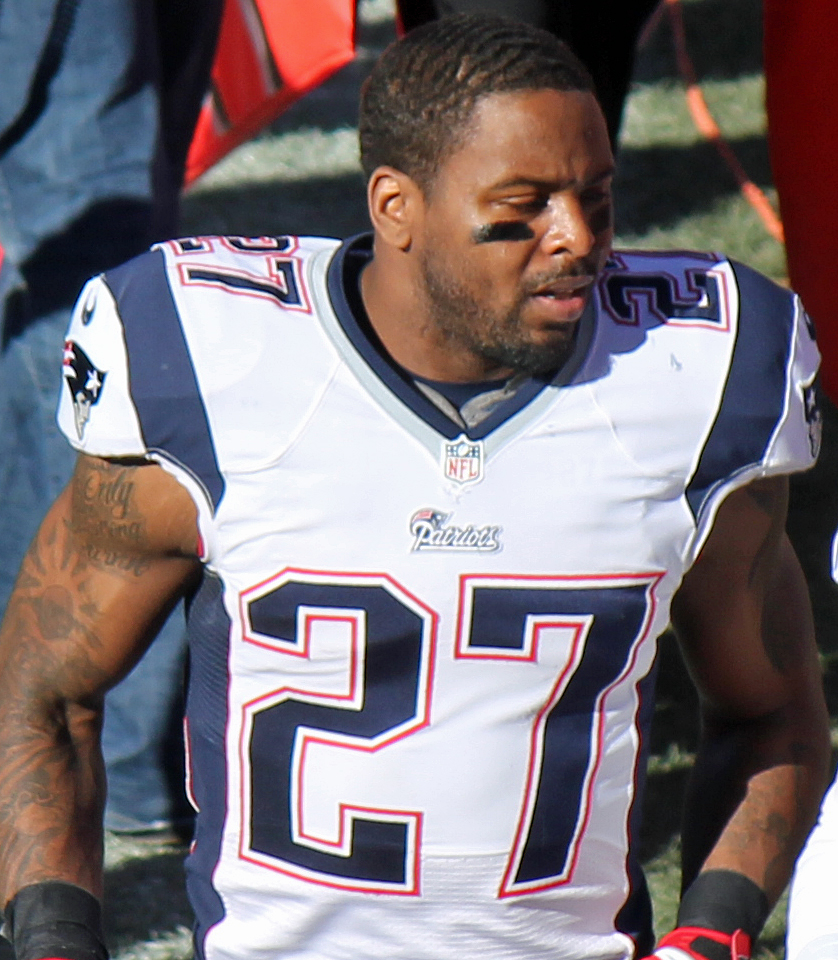
- Wilson with the New England Patriots in 2014

No. 27, 32, 31
- Position: Safety

Personal information
- Born: March 19, 1990 (age 36); Washington, D.C., U.S.
- Listed height: 6 ft 0 in (1.83 m)
- Listed weight: 208 lb (94 kg)

Career information
- High school: H.D. Woodson (Washington, D.C.)
- College: Illinois (2008–2011)
- NFL draft: 2012: 2nd round, 48th overall pick

Career history
- New England Patriots (2012–2015); Detroit Lions (2016–2019); Indianapolis Colts (2020); San Francisco 49ers (2021)

Awards and highlights
- Super Bowl champion (XLIX)

Career NFL statistics
- Total tackles: 393
- Sacks: 5.0
- Forced fumbles: 1
- Fumble recoveries: 7
- Interceptions: 8
- Pass deflections: 21
- Defensive touchdowns: 1
- Stats at Pro Football Reference

Tavon Wilson (born March 19, 1990) is an American former professional football player who was a safety in the National Football League (NFL). He played college football for the Illinois Fighting Illini, and was selected by the New England Patriots in the second round of the 2012 NFL draft. With the Patriots, Wilson won Super Bowl XLIX, and he has also played for the Detroit Lions and Indianapolis Colts.

== College career ==
Wilson started the last 38 games of his collegiate career, spanning his sophomore, junior, and senior seasons. In 2011, he was named the team's outstanding defensive back at the annual postseason banquet.

== Professional career ==
=== Pre-draft ===
Wilson did not receive an invitation to the NFL Scouting Combine. He was invited to the Super Regional Combine in Detroit, Michigan, but declined the invitation. On March 30, 2012, he participated at Illinois' pro day and performed all of the combine and positional drills. During the draft process, Wilson attended private visits with multiple teams, including the Tampa Bay Buccaneers, Houston Texans, Arizona Cardinals, Atlanta Falcons, Indianapolis Colts, Baltimore Ravens, and San Diego Chargers. At the conclusion of the pre-draft process, Wilson was projected to be a sixth or seventh round pick by the majority of NFL draft experts and scouts. He was ranked the ninth best free safety prospect in the draft and was ranked the 24th best safety in the draft by ESPN Scouts inc.

Pre-draft measurables
Height	Weight	Arm length	Hand span	40-yard dash	10-yard split	20-yard split	20-yard shuttle	Three-cone drill	Vertical jump	Broad jump	Bench press
5 ft 11 3/4 in (1.82 m)	205 lb (93 kg)	31 3/8 in (0.80 m)	9 in (0.23 m)	4.52 s	1.60 s	2.56 s	4.16 s	7.04 s	32.0 in (0.81 m)	10 ft 4 in (3.15 m)	17 reps
All values from Illinois' Pro Day

=== New England Patriots ===
==== 2012 ====
The New England Patriots selected Wilson in the second round (48th overall) of the 2012 NFL draft. Wilson was the third safety drafted in 2012, behind Mark Barron and Harrison Smith. The Patriots' selection of Wilson was immediately met with criticism as he was a virtually unknown prospect. Many analysts questioned the selection and labeled it a reach by head coach Bill Belichick. NFL draft analyst Mel Kiper did not have any notes on Wilson due to low draft status.

External videos
- Patriots draft Tavon Wilson 48th overall

On May 12, 2012, the Patriots signed Wilson to a fully guaranteed four-year, $4.21 million contract that includes a signing bonus of $1.50 million.

Throughout training camp, he competed for a job as a backup safety against James Ihedigbo, Nate Ebner, Josh Barrett, and Sergio Brown. Head coach Bill Belichick named Wilson the backup free safety to begin the regular season, behind Steve Gregory.

He made his professional regular season debut in the New England Patriots' season-opener at the Tennessee Titans and recorded four combined tackles, two pass deflections, and made his first career interception off a pass by Jake Locker in their 34–13 victory. Wilson made his first career tackle on Chris Johnson in the second quarter. On October 7, 2012, Wilson earned his first career start in place of Steve Gregory who sustained a hip injury. He collected a season-high ten combined tackles (five solo) during their 31–21 victory against the Denver Broncos in Week 5. In Week 8, he recorded three combined tackles, a pass deflection, and returned an interception by Case Keenum for a 45-yard gain during a 45–7 victory against the St. Louis Rams at Wembley Stadium. He finished his rookie season with 41 total tackles (28 solo), six pass deflections, and four interceptions in 16 games and four starts. Wilson played in 464 snaps on defense (42.3%) and played 238 snaps on special teams (48.7%).

The New England Patriots finished first in the AFC East division with a 12–4 record and received a first round bye and home-field advantage. On January 13, 2013, Wilson appeared in his first career playoff game and made three combined tackles in the Patriots' 41–28 victory against the Houston Texans in the AFC Divisional Round. The following week, the Patriots were eliminated after being defeated by the Baltimore Ravens in the AFC Championship game.

==== 2013 ====
During training camp, Wilson competed to be the starting strong safety against Adrian Wilson, Steve Gregory, Duron Harmon, and Marquice Cole. He was named the backup free safety, behind Devin McCourty, to begin the regular season.

Wilson was inactive for three games (Weeks 5–7) due to an injury he sustained to his hamstring. In Week 11, he collected a season-high two solo tackles in the Patriots' 24-20 loss at the Carolina Panthers. On December 22, 2013, Wilson made one solo tackle and returned an interception by Tyrod Taylor for a 74-yard touchdown during a 41-7 victory at the Baltimore Ravens in Week 16. Throughout the season, he was used primarily on special teams and was limited to three solo tackles, an interception, and a touchdown in 13 games and zero starts. Wilson saw a sharp decrease in his playing time on defense and was limited to only 17 snaps on defense (1.4%), but played 253 snaps on special teams (54.7%).

==== 2014 ====
Wilson entered camp as a candidate to replace Steve Gregory at strong safety. Wilson competed for the job against Patrick Chung and Duron Harmon. He was named the backup free safety to Devin McCourty to start the season.

In Week 17, Wilson collected a season-high five combined tackles during a 17–9 loss to the Buffalo Bills. He finished his third season with 22 combined tackles (19 solo) and two pass deflections in 16 games and zero starts. He had a larger role on defense and played in 183 defensive snaps (16.7%). Wilson also maintained his prominent role on special teams and played in 324 snaps (69.5%).

The New England Patriots finished atop the AFC East division with a 12–4 record. They received a first round bye and home-field advantage throughout the playoffs. The Patriots went on to reach the Super Bowl after defeating the Baltimore Ravens 35–31 in the AFC Divisional round and defeating the Indianapolis Colts 45–7 in the AFC Championship Game. On February 1, 2015, Wilson played on special teams in Super Bowl XLIX as the Patriots defeated the Seattle Seahawks 28–24.

==== 2015 ====
Wilson was in danger of losing his roster spot during training camp in 2015. He was on the roster bubble as Patrick Chung and Devin McCourty were entrenched in the starting roles at safety, Duron Harmon was slated as the third safety in their three-safety technique, and rookie Jordan Richards was virtually guaranteed a roster spot as a second round pick in the 2015 NFL draft. He competed to be the fifth safety on the roster as a backup and a special teams player against Nate Ebner. Head coach Bill Belichick opted to keep six safeties on the depth chart and named Wilson the backup free safety behind Devin McCourty to start the regular season.

In Week 11, Wilson recorded a season-high three solo tackles and a pass deflection during a 20–13 win against the Buffalo Bills. He finished his last season with the New England Patriots with 13 combined tackles (ten solo) and two pass deflections in nine games and zero starts. He played 155 snaps on special teams (31.5%) and was limited to 83 snaps on defense (7.6%). Wilson was a healthy scratch for seven games as the Patriots chose to only carry five safeties during those contests. He was also inactive for both of the Patriots' playoff games.

Wilson became an unrestricted free agent after completing his four-year rookie contract. The New England Patriots chose not to re-sign Wilson after re-signing Nate Ebner to replace him on special teams and Jordan Richards adequately replacing Wilson on defense. They did not offer Wilson a contract after the 2015 season.

=== Detroit Lions ===
==== 2016 ====
On March 10, 2016, the Detroit Lions signed Wilson to a two-year, $2.20 million contract with a signing bonus of $500,000. General manager Bob Quinn targeted Wilson in free agent due to his past relationship with Wilson as the Patriots' Director of Pro Scouting and was an integral part of the Patriots' decision of drafting Wilson in 2012.

Throughout training camp, Wilson competed to be the Lions' starting strong safety against Rafael Bush and rookie Miles Killebrew. Head coach Jim Caldwell chose Wilson as the starting strong safety to start the season, opposite free safety Glover Quin.

He started in the Lions' season opener at the Indianapolis Colts and recorded four solo tackles in their 39–35 victory. On October 30, 2016, Wilson collected a season-high nine combined tackles during a 20–13 loss at the Houston Texans in Week 8. The following week, he collected a season-high eight solo tackles in the Lions' 22–16 win at the Minnesota Vikings in Week 9. On November 20, 2016, Wilson recorded five solo tackles, a pass deflection, and made his first interception as a member of the Lions during a 26–19 win against the Jacksonville Jaguars in Week 11. In Week 17, he collected seven combined tackles and made his first career sack on quarterback Aaron Rodgers in a 31–24 loss to the Green Bay Packers. He finished his first season in Detroit with a career-high 89 combined tackles (74 solo), two pass deflections, two interceptions, and a sack in 15 games and 14 starts. Wilson received the 21st highest grade among all qualifying safeties from Pro Football Focus in 2016.

The Lions finished second in the NFC North with a 9–7 record and received a playoff berth as a wildcard team. On January 7, 2017, Wilson started his first career playoff game and recorded seven combined tackles in the Lions' 26–6 loss to the Seattle Seahawks in the NFC Wildcard Game.

==== 2017 ====
During training camp, Wilson competed to retain his role as the starting strong safety against Miles Killebrew. Defensive coordinator Teryl Austin named Wilson the starting strong safety to begin the regular season, alongside Glover Quin.

Wilson started in the Lions' season opener against the Arizona Cardinals, recorded three solo tackles, broke up a pass and intercepted a pass by Carson Palmer in their 35–23 victory. Wilson was inactive for the Lions' Week 3 loss at the Atlanta Falcons after injuring his shoulder. On October 29, 2017, Wilson collected a season-high 11 combined tackles (six solo) during a 20–15 loss to the Pittsburgh Steelers in Week 8. In Week 10, he collected seven combined tackles and a sack during a 38–24 win against the Cleveland Browns. On November 27, 2017, the Lions placed Wilson on injured reserve after suffering a shoulder injury in Week 12. He finished the season with 55 combined tackles (42 solo), two pass deflections, two sacks, and an interception in ten games and nine starts. Pro Football Focus gave Wilson an overall grade of 45.4, ranking 79th among all qualified safeties in 2017.

==== 2018 ====
On March 13, 2018, the Lions signed Wilson to a two-year, $7 million contract that includes $3.25 million guaranteed and a signing bonus of $1.75 million.

==== 2019 ====
In 2019, Wilson played in all 16 games (starting 13), and made a career-high 92 tackles. He also had a sack, five passes defensed, and two fumble recoveries.

=== Indianapolis Colts ===
On August 11, 2020, Wilson signed with the Indianapolis Colts. He played in 15 games with two starts as a backup safety and core special teamer.

=== San Francisco 49ers ===
On March 22, 2021, Wilson signed a one-year deal with the San Francisco 49ers. He was placed on injured reserve on November 15, 2021.

== NFL career statistics ==
Legend
**Bold**	Career high

=== Regular season ===
Year	Team	Games		Tackles					Interceptions					Fumbles			
Year	Team	GP	GS	Cmb	Solo	Ast	Sck	TFL	Int	Yds	TD	Lng	PD	FF	FR	Yds	TD
2012	NWE	16	4	41	28	13	0.0	0	**4**	**87**	0	45	**6**	0	**2**	0	0
2013	NWE	13	0	3	3	0	0.0	0	1	74	**1**	**74**	1	0	0	0	0
2014	NWE	16	0	22	19	3	0.0	1	0	0	0	0	2	0	0	0	0
2015	NWE	9	0	13	10	3	0.0	0	0	0	0	0	1	0	0	0	0
2016	DET	15	14	89	**74**	15	1.0	4	2	23	0	18	2	0	**2**	-2	0
2017	DET	10	9	55	42	13	**2.0**	**6**	1	23	0	23	2	**1**	0	0	0
2018	DET	15	3	36	30	6	1.0	2	0	0	0	0	0	0	0	0	0
2019	DET	16	13	**98**	69	**29**	1.0	3	0	0	0	0	5	0	**2**	**14**	0
2020	IND	15	2	26	23	3	0.0	2	0	0	0	0	1	0	1	0	0
2021	SFO	8	1	10	6	4	0.0	0	0	0	0	0	1	0	0	0	0
		133	46	393	304	89	5.0	18	8	207	1	74	21	1	7	12	0

=== Postseason ===
Year	Team	Games		Tackles					Interceptions					Fumbles			
Year	Team	GP	GS	Cmb	Solo	Ast	Sck	TFL	Int	Yds	TD	Lng	PD	FF	FR	Yds	TD
2012	NWE	2	0	3	2	**1**	0.0	0	0	0	0	0	0	0	0	0	0
2013	NWE	2	0	0	0	0	0.0	0	0	0	0	0	0	0	0	0	0
2014	NWE	3	0	2	1	**1**	0.0	0	0	0	0	0	0	0	0	0	0
2016	DET	1	1	**7**	**6**	**1**	0.0	0	0	0	0	0	0	0	0	0	0
2020	IND	1	0	1	1	0	0.0	0	0	0	0	0	0	0	0	0	0
		9	1	13	10	3	0.0	0	0	0	0	0	0	0	0	0	0
