= Greg Brown (defensive lineman) =

American football player (1957–2020)

No. 98
- Positions: Defensive tackle, defensive end

Personal information
- Born: January 5, 1957; Washington, D.C., U.S.
- Died: September 26, 2020 (aged 63)
- Listed height: 6 ft 5 in (1.96 m)
- Listed weight: 254 lb (115 kg)

Career information
- High school: H.D. Woodson (Washington, D.C.)
- College: Eastern Illinois; Kansas State
- NFL draft: 1981: undrafted

Career history
- Philadelphia Eagles (1981–1986); Atlanta Falcons (1987–1988)

Career NFL statistics
- Sacks: 52.5
- Fumble recoveries: 7
- Touchdowns: 2
- Safeties: 1
- Stats at Pro Football Reference

Gregory Lee Brown (January 5, 1957 – September 26, 2020) was a professional American football defensive lineman in the National Football League (NFL) for eight seasons for the Philadelphia Eagles and the Atlanta Falcons. He played college football at Eastern Illinois University.
