= Inter-High School Athletic Association =

Defunct high school athletic conference

The Inter-High School Athletic Association was a high school athletic conference active from approximately 1896 to 1958.

It was formed around 1896, when the first track and field meet of the Washington, D.C. schools was inaugurated. A football championship of the schools had been conducted since 1893, but it usually consisted of contests between just two schools. There was no football league until at least the 1898 season. A baseball league was begun in 1897, and basketball was added to the program in 1916. Tennis and swimming were added to the program after World War I, but without any league championship meet. A tennis meet was added in 1925, and a golf meet in 1927.

Original members were Central, Western, Eastern, and Business. Technical was added in 1902. Anacostia and Wilson joined the league in the 1930s. The schools in D.C. were segregated during the history of this league, and therefore the African-American schools in the district, namely Armstrong, Dunbar, and Cardozo, were not a part of the Inter-High School conference. A new conference was formed in 1958 -- the D.C. Interscholastic Athletic Association -- which brought into one league all the District public high schools.

== See also ==
- District of Columbia Public Schools
