= District of Columbia Interscholastic Athletic Association =

American public high school athletic league

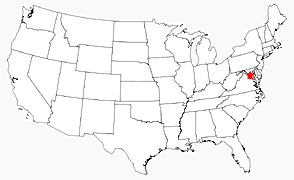
- Abbreviation: DCIAA
- Formation: 1958
- Type: Volunteer; NPO
- Legal status: Association (Athletic/Educational)
- Headquarters: 3535 V St. NE; Washington, D.C. 20018
- Athletic Director: Michael Bryant
- Affiliations: National Federation of State High School Associations
- Budget: $3,031,000
- Staff: 12
- Website: https://thedciaa.com/
- Remarks: (202) 729-3288

The District of Columbia Interscholastic Athletic Association (DCIAA) is the public high school athletic league of Washington, D.C. The league was founded in 1958. The original high school conference for D.C. schools was the Inter-High School Athletic Association, formed around 1896. That organization was segregated, and black schools in the District formed their own athletic association. The Inter-High League was renamed the DCIAA in 1989 to bring the District of Columbia in line with other states with interscholastic athletic programs. The DCIAA offers sports on the elementary, middle and high school levels (grades 4th through 12th).

The DCIAA sponsors varsity championships in archery, basketball, baseball, bowling, cheer, cross country, football, flag football, golf, lacrosse, soccer, softball, swimming, tennis, track and field, volleyball and wrestling.

== Members (HS) ==
School	Mascot	Enrollment
Anacostia High School	Indians	244
Ballou High School	Knights	585
Ballou S.T.A.Y. High School		453
Bard High School Early College DC	Falcons	369
Benjamin Banneker High School	Bulldogs	671
Bell Multicultural High School (CHEC)	Griffins	1494
Cardozo Senior High School	Clerks	706
Coolidge Senior High School	Colts	1093
Duke Ellington School of the Arts		579
Dunbar High School	Crimson Tide	984
Eastern High School	Ramblers	866
Garnet-Patterson S.T.A.Y. High School	Navigators	703
H.D. Woodson Senior High School	Warriors	544
Jackson-Reed High School	Tigers	1994
Luke C. Moore High School	Eagles	264
MacArthur High School	Mammoths	238
McKinley Technology High School	Trainers	704
Phelps High School	Panthers	310
Ron Brown High School	Monarchs	161
School Without Walls	Penguins	599
Theodore Roosevelt Senior High School	Rough Riders	908

== High School Sports ==
The DCIAA sponsors high school varsity competition in eight boys', ten girls' and four co-ed sanctioned sports. Student-athletes in grades 9-12 are eligible to participate in elementary sports.

=== High school teams in DCIAA competition ===
Sports	Boys'	Girls'	Co-Ed
Baseball	11	-	-
Basketball	16	16	-
Bowling	-	9	-
Cheer	-	-	16
Cross Country	15	13	-
Flag Football	-	12	-
Football	13	-	-
Golf	-	-	9
Indoor Track & Field	17	16	-
Outdoor Track & Field	18	17	-
Soccer	10	7	-
Softball	-	9	-
Swimming	6	7	-
Tennis	-	-	11
Volleyball	-	16	-
Wrestling	-	-	8

=== High School Boys' varsity sponsored sports by school ===
School	Baseball	Basketball	Cross Country	Football	Indoor Track	Outdoor Track	Soccer	Swimming	Total DCIAA Sports
Anacostia	No	Yes	Yes	Yes	Yes	Yes	No	No	5
Ballou	Yes	Yes	No	Yes	Yes	Yes	No	No	5
Banneker	No	Yes	Yes	No	Yes	Yes	Yes	No	5
Bard	No	Yes	Yes	No	Yes	Yes	No	No	4
Bell (CHEC)	Yes	Yes	Yes	Yes	Yes	Yes	Yes	Yes	8
Cardozo	No	Yes	Yes	Yes	Yes	Yes	Yes	No	6
Coolidge	Yes	Yes	Yes	Yes	Yes	Yes	Yes	Yes	8
Duke Ellington	No	No	No	No	No	Yes	No	No	1
Dunbar	Yes	Yes	Yes	Yes	Yes	Yes	Yes	No	7
Eastern	Yes	Yes	Yes	Yes	Yes	Yes	No	No	6
H.D. Woodson	Yes	Yes	No	Yes	Yes	Yes	No	Yes	6
Jackson-Reed	Yes	Yes	Yes	Yes	Yes	Yes	Yes	Yes	8
MacArthur	No	No	Yes	No	Yes	Yes	Yes	No	4
McKinley Tech	Yes	Yes	Yes	Yes	Yes	Yes	Yes	No	7
Phelps	Yes	Yes	Yes	Yes	Yes	Yes	No	No	6
Ron Brown	No	Yes	Yes	Yes	Yes	Yes	No	No	5
Roosevelt	Yes	Yes	Yes	Yes	Yes	Yes	Yes	Yes	8
School Without Walls	Yes	Yes	Yes	No	Yes	Yes	Yes	Yes	7
Total Teams	11	16	15	13	17	18	10	6	106

=== High School Girls' varsity sponsored sports by school ===
School	Basketball	Bowling	Cross Country	Flag Football	Indoor Track	Outdoor Track	Soccer	Softball	Swimming	Volleyball	Total DCIAA Sports
Anacostia	Yes	Yes	Yes	Yes	Yes	Yes	No	No	No	Yes	7
Ballou	Yes	Yes	No	Yes	Yes	Yes	No	No	No	Yes	6
Banneker	Yes	No	Yes	Yes	Yes	Yes	Yes	Yes	No	Yes	8
Bard	Yes	No	Yes	Yes	Yes	Yes	No	No	No	Yes	6
Bell (CHEC)	Yes	Yes	Yes	Yes	Yes	Yes	Yes	Yes	Yes	Yes	10
Cardozo	Yes	Yes	No	No	Yes	Yes	Yes	Yes	No	Yes	7
Coolidge	Yes	No	Yes	Yes	Yes	Yes	Yes	Yes	Yes	Yes	9
Duke Ellington	No	No	No	No	No	Yes	No	No	No	No	1
Dunbar	Yes	Yes	Yes	Yes	Yes	Yes	No	No	Yes	Yes	8
Eastern	Yes	No	Yes	Yes	Yes	Yes	No	Yes	No	Yes	7
H.D. Woodson	Yes	Yes	No	Yes	Yes	Yes	No	Yes	Yes	Yes	8
Jackson-Reed	Yes	Yes	Yes	No	Yes	Yes	Yes	Yes	Yes	Yes	9
MacArthur	Yes	No	Yes	No	Yes	Yes	No	No	No	Yes	5
McKinley Tech	Yes	Yes	Yes	Yes	Yes	Yes	Yes	No	No	Yes	8
Phelps	Yes	No	Yes	No	Yes	Yes	No	No	No	Yes	5
Roosevelt	Yes	Yes	Yes	Yes	Yes	Yes	No	No	Yes	Yes	8
School Without Walls	Yes	No	Yes	Yes	Yes	Yes	Yes	Yes	Yes	Yes	9
Total Teams	16	9	13	12	16	17	7	9	7	16	121

=== High School Co-Ed varsity sponsored sports by school ===
School	Cheer	Golf	Tennis	Wrestling	Total DCIAA Sports
Anacostia	Yes	Yes	Yes	Yes	4
Ballou	Yes	No	No	Yes	2
Banneker	Yes	No	Yes	No	2
Bard	Yes	No	No	No	1
Bell (CHEC)	Yes	Yes	Yes	Yes	4
Cardozo	Yes	Yes	Yes	Yes	4
Coolidge	Yes	No	No	No	1
Dunbar	Yes	Yes	Yes	Yes	4
Eastern	Yes	Yes	Yes	No	3
H.D. Woodson	Yes	Yes	No	Yes	3
Jackson-Reed	Yes	No	Yes	Yes	3
MacArthur	Yes	Yes	Yes	No	3
McKinley Tech	Yes	Yes	Yes	No	3
Phelps	Yes	No	No	No	1
Roosevelt	Yes	No	Yes	Yes	3
School Without Walls	Yes	Yes	Yes	No	3
Total Teams	16	9	11	8	44

== Football divisions (HS) ==
In 2013, the District of Columbia Interscholastic Athletic Association (DCIAA) reorganized football into two competitive divisions to improve competitive balance among member schools. The previous East–West alignment was replaced by the upper-level Stars Division and the lower-level Stripes Division.

The Stars Division champion is determined in the annual Turkey Bowl, while the Stripes Division champion is determined in the annual Gravy Bowl.

The DCIAA uses a promotion system through which Stripes Division programs may qualify to move into the Stars Division. The original system required a school to win consecutive Gravy Bowls. In 2023, the requirement was changed to two Gravy Bowl championships within a three-year period.

=== Current alignment (2026–27) ===
The following alignment reflects the DCIAA football schedule for the 2026–27 season.

Stars Division	Stripes Division
Ballou; Bell (CHEC); Coolidge; Dunbar; Eastern; H.D. Woodson; Theodore Roosevelt	Anacostia; Cardozo; Jackson-Reed; McKinley Tech; Phelps; Ron Brown

=== Divisional changes ===
Season	Divisional change
2016–17	Eastern moved from the Stripes Division to the Stars Division, while Coolidge moved from the Stars Division to the Stripes Division.
2018–19	Theodore Roosevelt moved from the Stripes Division to the Stars Division, while Anacostia moved from the Stars Division to the Stripes Division.
2024–25	Coolidge moved from the Stripes Division to the Stars Division after winning the 2022 and 2023 Gravy Bowls.
2026–27	Bell (CHEC) moved from the Stripes Division to the Stars Division after winning the 2024 and 2025 Gravy Bowls, while Jackson-Reed moved from the Stars Division to the Stripes Division.

== Football Championships (HS) ==
The DCIAA crowned a single football champion from 1955 through 2012. Beginning in 2013, the league divided its football championship into the Stars Division and Stripes Division. The Stars Division championship is decided in the annual Turkey Bowl, while the Stripes Division championship is decided in the Gravy Bowl.

== Football Championships (HS) ==
The public-school football championship history listed below begins in 1955. The championship was first played on Thanksgiving Day under the Turkey Bowl name in 1969, when Coolidge defeated McKinley Tech. In 2013, the DCIAA replaced its previous alignment with a two-tier system consisting of the upper-level Stars Division and lower-level Stripes Division. The Stars championship continues to be decided in the Turkey Bowl, while the Stripes championship is decided in the Gravy Bowl. McKinley Tech defeated Phelps in the inaugural Gravy Bowl in 2013.

For historical comparison, the all-time top-level records combine the single-championship era through 2012 with the Stars Division/Turkey Bowl results beginning in 2013. Gravy Bowl championships are listed separately and are not included in the top-level totals.

=== Pre-Turkey Bowl championship era (1955–1968) ===
Year	Champion	Runner-up/finalist	Score
1955	Cardozo	Spingarn	26–6
1956	Anacostia	Cardozo	14–0
1957	Anacostia	Wilson	12–0
1958	Eastern	Wilson	20–14
1959	Eastern	Wilson	19–13
1960	Eastern	Bell	25–6
1961	Eastern	Theodore Roosevelt	27–0
1962	Theodore Roosevelt	Eastern	2–0
1963	Theodore Roosevelt	Eastern	13–6
1964	Bell	Phelps	12–0
1965	Bell	Spingarn	31–19
1966	Bell	McKinley Tech	13–3
1967	Western	Eastern	19–13
1968	Cardozo	McKinley Tech	24–19

=== Turkey Bowl single-championship era (1969–2012) ===
Year	Champion	Runner-up/finalist	Score
1969	Coolidge	McKinley Tech	20–2
1970	McKinley Tech	Cardozo	19–0
1971	Eastern	Dunbar	18–8
1972	Coolidge	Anacostia	14–12
1973	Anacostia	Theodore Roosevelt	22–0
1974	Theodore Roosevelt	Anacostia	13–6
1975	H.D. Woodson	Dunbar	14–0
1976	Theodore Roosevelt	Spingarn	14–8
1977	Eastern	Theodore Roosevelt	13–0
1978	Eastern	Dunbar	13–0
1979	Theodore Roosevelt	Spingarn	20–19
1980	Coolidge	Ballou	18–8
1981	H.D. Woodson	Theodore Roosevelt	7–6
1982	H.D. Woodson	Coolidge	33–0
1983	Anacostia	Dunbar	30–6
1984	Anacostia	Theodore Roosevelt	26–13
1985	Coolidge	H.D. Woodson	35–6
1986	Coolidge	H.D. Woodson	32–13
1987	H.D. Woodson	Coolidge	21–6
1988	Anacostia	Cardozo	20–19
1989	Anacostia	Wilson	38–26
1990	Eastern	Wilson	13–6
1991	Wilson	Anacostia	27–6
1992	Dunbar	Anacostia	23–12
1993	H.D. Woodson	Anacostia	14–12
1994	H.D. Woodson	Anacostia	6–0
1995	Anacostia	Dunbar	40–31
1996	Cardozo	Anacostia	36–32
1997	H.D. Woodson	Anacostia	26–22
1998	Dunbar	Theodore Roosevelt	28–20
1999	Dunbar	Eastern	22–0
2000	Dunbar	Ballou	35–12
2001	Dunbar	H.D. Woodson	16–14
2002	H.D. Woodson	Dunbar	19–3
2003	Dunbar	Ballou	33–20
2004	Dunbar	H.D. Woodson	33–0
2005	Dunbar	Coolidge	43–14
2006	Ballou	Dunbar	34–33
2007	Dunbar	H.D. Woodson	20–9
2008	H.D. Woodson	Dunbar	24–6
2009	H.D. Woodson	Ballou	30–26
2010	H.D. Woodson	Dunbar	44–12
2011	Dunbar	Coolidge	33–21
2012	No champion	Anacostia	Dunbar won 12–8 on the field; the title was later vacated and was not awarded to Anacostia

=== Stars Division Turkey Bowl (2013–present) ===
Year	Champion	Runner-up/finalist	Score
2013	H.D. Woodson	Wilson	25–13
2014	H.D. Woodson	Ballou	16–12
2015	H.D. Woodson	Wilson	40–24
2016	H.D. Woodson	Wilson	22–20
2017	Ballou	H.D. Woodson	21–14
2018	H.D. Woodson	Ballou	18–12
2019	Dunbar	H.D. Woodson	21–12
2020	No championship; season canceled because of the COVID-19 pandemic		
2021	Theodore Roosevelt	H.D. Woodson	37–22
2022	Theodore Roosevelt	Dunbar	26–18
2023	Dunbar	Ballou	28–7
2024	Dunbar	Coolidge	35–21
2025	Coolidge	Dunbar	15–14

=== Stripes Division Gravy Bowl (2013–present) ===
Year	Champion	Runner-up/finalist	Score
2013	McKinley Tech	Phelps	34–0
2014	Eastern	Bell (CHEC)	33–13
2015	Eastern	Bell (CHEC)	45–8
2016	Theodore Roosevelt	Bell (CHEC)	16–6
2017	Theodore Roosevelt	Bell (CHEC)	13–12
2018	Bell (CHEC)	McKinley Tech	47–0
2019	Coolidge	Anacostia	8–6
2020	No championship; season canceled because of the COVID-19 pandemic		
2021	Bell (CHEC)	Coolidge	10–0
2022	Coolidge	Bell (CHEC)	21–6
2023	Coolidge	Anacostia	14–6
2024	Bell (CHEC)	Anacostia	49–8
2025	Bell (CHEC)	Ron Brown	54–0

=== Championship records by school ===
The tables below count championship-game appearances. Dunbar's 2012 appearance is included in the appearance total, but its on-field victory is listed as a vacated result rather than a championship. Anacostia is counted as the losing finalist in that game because DCPS did not award the championship to either school.

==== All-time top-level DCIAA championships (1955–present) ====
School	Championships	Finalist losses	Vacated results	Appearances
H.D. Woodson	16	8	0	24
Dunbar	13	11	1	25
Anacostia	8	9	0	17
Eastern	8	4	0	12
Theodore Roosevelt	7	6	0	13
Coolidge	6	5	0	11
Cardozo	3	3	0	6
Bell (CHEC)	3	1	0	4
Ballou	2	7	0	9
Jackson-Reed/Wilson	1	8	0	9
McKinley Tech	1	3	0	4
Western	1	0	0	1
Spingarn	0	4	0	4
Phelps	0	1	0	1

==== Pre-Turkey Bowl records (1955–1968) ====
School	Championships	Finalist losses	Appearances
Eastern	4	3	7
Bell (CHEC)	3	1	4
Cardozo	2	1	3
Theodore Roosevelt	2	1	3
Anacostia	2	0	2
Western	1	0	1
Jackson-Reed/Wilson	0	3	3
McKinley Tech	0	2	2
Spingarn	0	2	2
Phelps	0	1	1

==== All-time Turkey Bowl records (1969–present) ====
School	Championships	Finalist losses	Vacated results	Appearances
H.D. Woodson	16	8	0	24
Dunbar	13	11	1	25
Anacostia	6	9	0	15
Coolidge	6	5	0	11
Theodore Roosevelt	5	5	0	10
Eastern	4	1	0	5
Ballou	2	7	0	9
Jackson-Reed/Wilson	1	5	0	6
Cardozo	1	2	0	3
McKinley Tech	1	1	0	2
Spingarn	0	2	0	2

==== Divisional-era Turkey Bowl records (2013–present) ====
School	Championships	Finalist losses	Appearances
H.D. Woodson	5	3	8
Dunbar	3	2	5
Theodore Roosevelt	2	0	2
Ballou	1	3	4
Coolidge	1	1	2
Jackson-Reed/Wilson	0	3	3

==== Gravy Bowl records (2013–present) ====
School	Championships	Finalist losses	Appearances
Bell (CHEC)	4	5	9
Coolidge	3	1	4
Eastern	2	0	2
Theodore Roosevelt	2	0	2
McKinley Tech	1	1	2
Anacostia	0	3	3
Phelps	0	1	1
Ron Brown	0	1	1

=== Championship seasons by school ===
==== Pre-Turkey Bowl championship seasons ====
School	Championships	Championship seasons
Eastern	4	1958, 1959, 1960, 1961
Bell (CHEC)	3	1964, 1965, 1966
Anacostia	2	1956, 1957
Cardozo	2	1955, 1968
Theodore Roosevelt	2	1962, 1963
Western	1	1967

==== Turkey Bowl championship seasons ====
School	Championships	Championship seasons
H.D. Woodson	16	1975, 1981, 1982, 1987, 1993, 1994, 1997, 2002, 2008, 2009, 2010, 2013, 2014, 2015, 2016, 2018
Dunbar	13	1992, 1998, 1999, 2000, 2001, 2003, 2004, 2005, 2007, 2011, 2019, 2023, 2024
Anacostia	6	1973, 1983, 1984, 1988, 1989, 1995
Coolidge	6	1969, 1972, 1980, 1985, 1986, 2025
Theodore Roosevelt	5	1974, 1976, 1979, 2021, 2022
Eastern	4	1971, 1977, 1978, 1990
Ballou	2	2006, 2017
Cardozo	1	1996
Jackson-Reed/Wilson	1	1991
McKinley Tech	1	1970

==== Divisional-era Turkey Bowl championship seasons ====
School	Championships	Championship seasons
H.D. Woodson	5	2013, 2014, 2015, 2016, 2018
Dunbar	3	2019, 2023, 2024
Theodore Roosevelt	2	2021, 2022
Ballou	1	2017
Coolidge	1	2025

==== Gravy Bowl championship seasons ====
School	Championships	Championship seasons
Bell (CHEC)	4	2018, 2021, 2024, 2025
Coolidge	3	2019, 2022, 2023
Eastern	2	2014, 2015
Theodore Roosevelt	2	2016, 2017
McKinley Tech	1	2013

=== Records and streaks ===
==== Consecutive top-level championships ====
School	Consecutive championships	Seasons
Eastern	4	1958–1961
Dunbar	4	1998–2001
H.D. Woodson	4	2013–2016
Bell (CHEC)	3	1964–1966

==== Consecutive top-level championship appearances ====
School	Consecutive appearances	Seasons
Dunbar	11	1998–2008
H.D. Woodson	8	2013–2021
Anacostia	7	1991–1997
Eastern	6	1958–1963
Coolidge	3	1985–1987
Jackson-Reed/Wilson	3	1989–1991

The 2020 championship was canceled, so H.D. Woodson's streak represents eight consecutive Turkey Bowls that were actually played.

==== Consecutive Gravy Bowl championships ====
School	Consecutive championships	Seasons
Eastern	2	2014–2015
Theodore Roosevelt	2	2016–2017
Coolidge	2	2022–2023
Bell (CHEC)	2	2024–2025

==== Longest top-level championship droughts ended ====
School	Previous championship	Next championship	Calendar years
Theodore Roosevelt	1979	2021	42
Coolidge	1986	2025	39
Cardozo	1968	1996	28
Anacostia	1957	1973	16
Eastern	1978	1990	12
Ballou	2006	2017	11

=== Top-level championships by decade ===
Decade	Leading school(s)	Championships
1950s	Anacostia; Eastern	2 each
1960s	Bell (CHEC)	3
1970s	Eastern; Theodore Roosevelt	3 each
1980s	Anacostia	4
1990s	Dunbar; H.D. Woodson	3 each
2000s	Dunbar	6
2010s	H.D. Woodson	6
2020s	Dunbar; Theodore Roosevelt	2 each

=== Selected championship-game records ===
The records below are calculated from the scores in the championship tables.

Competition	Largest margin	Highest combined score	Lowest combined score	Closest final
All top-level championships	33 points: H.D. Woodson 33–0 Coolidge (1982); Dunbar 33–0 H.D. Woodson (2004)	71 points: Anacostia 40–31 Dunbar (1995)	2 points: Theodore Roosevelt 2–0 Eastern (1962)	1 point, five times; most recently Coolidge 15–14 Dunbar (2025)
Divisional-era Turkey Bowl	21 points: Dunbar 28–7 Ballou (2023)	64 points: H.D. Woodson 40–24 Wilson (2015)	28 points: H.D. Woodson 16–12 Ballou (2014)	1 point: Coolidge 15–14 Dunbar (2025)
Gravy Bowl	54 points: Bell (CHEC) 54–0 Ron Brown (2025)	57 points: Bell (CHEC) 49–8 Anacostia (2024)	10 points: Bell (CHEC) 10–0 Coolidge (2021)	1 point: Theodore Roosevelt 13–12 Bell (CHEC) (2017)

=== Promotion between divisions ===
Under rules announced in 2023, a Stripes Division team is promoted to the Stars Division after winning two Gravy Bowl championships within a three-year span; the previous rule required two consecutive Gravy Bowl titles. Bell's 2024 and 2025 Gravy Bowl championships earned the program promotion to the Stars Division.

=== Stars Division Football Champions (2013–present) ===
Stars Division Football Champions
Year	Champion	Runner-up	Score
2013	H.D. Woodson	Wilson	25-13
2014	H.D. Woodson	Ballou	16-12
2015	H.D. Woodson	Wilson	40-24
2016	H.D. Woodson	Wilson	22-20
2017	Ballou	H.D. Woodson	21-14
2018	H.D. Woodson	Ballou	18-12
2019	Dunbar	H.D. Woodson	21-12
2021	Theodore Roosevelt	H.D. Woodson	35-7
2022	Theodore Roosevelt	Dunbar	26-18
2023	Dunbar	Ballou	28-7
2024	Dunbar	Coolidge	35-21
2025	Coolidge	Dunbar	15-14

=== Stripes Division Football Champions (2013–present) ===
Stripes Division Football Champions
Year	Champion	Runner-up	Score
2013	McKinley Tech	Phelps	34-0
2014	Eastern	Bell (CHEC)	33-13
2015	Eastern	Bell (CHEC)	45-8
2016	Theodore Roosevelt	Bell (CHEC)	16-6
2017	Theodore Roosevelt	Bell (CHEC)	13-12
2018	Bell (CHEC)	McKinley Tech	47-0
2019	Coolidge	Anacostia	8-6 (2 OT)
2021	Bell (CHEC)	Coolidge	10-0
2022	Coolidge	Bell (CHEC)	21-6
2023	Coolidge	Anacostia	14-6
2024	Bell (CHEC)	Anacostia	49-8
2025	Bell (CHEC)	Ron Brown	54-0

== Boys Baseball Championships (HS) ==
- 1991 - Bell
- 1992 - Bell
- 1993 - Wilson
- 1994 - Wilson
- 1995 - Wilson
- 1996 - Wilson
- 1997 - Wilson
- 1998 - Wilson
- 1999 - Wilson
- 2000 - Wilson
- 2001 - Wilson
- 2002 - Wilson
- 2003 - Wilson
- 2004 - Wilson
- 2005 - Wilson
- 2006 - Wilson
- 2007 - Wilson
- 2008 - Wilson
- 2009 - Wilson
- 2010 - Wilson
- 2011 - Wilson
- 2012 - Wilson
- 2013 - Wilson
- 2014 - Wilson
- 2015 - Wilson
- 2016 - Wilson
- 2017 - Wilson
- 2018 - Wilson
- 2019 - Wilson
- 2021 - Jackson-Reed (formerly known as Wilson)
- 2023 - Jackson-Reed
- 2024 - Jackson-Reed
- 2025 - Jackson-Reed
- 2026 - Jackson-Reed

== Boys basketball championships (HS) ==
During portions of the Interhigh era, D.C. public-school boys' basketball recognized both a regular-season league champion and a postseason tournament champion. The City Title Game generally matched the regular-season champions of the Interhigh and Catholic or Metro leagues. In 1984, for example, Dunbar won the Interhigh regular-season title, while Wilson defeated Spingarn, 62–60, to win the Interhigh tournament.

The championship history below is compiled from historical Interhigh records, year-by-year City Title results and contemporary reporting.

DCIAA and Interhigh boys' basketball champions
Year	Champion	Notes
1957	Cardozo	
1958	Cardozo	
1959	Cardozo	
1960	Spingarn	
1961	Spingarn	
1962	Eastern	
1963	Eastern	
1964	Cardozo	
1965	Cardozo	
1966	McKinley Tech	
1967	Cardozo	
1968	McKinley Tech	
1969	McKinley Tech	
1971	Ballou	Won the Interhigh championship and finished the season 23–3.
1972	Theodore Roosevelt	Interhigh champion.
1973	Western	
1974	Eastern	
1975	Dunbar	
1976	Dunbar	
1977	McKinley Tech	
1978	Dunbar	
1979	Dunbar	
1980	Spingarn	
1981	Dunbar	
1982	Spingarn	
1983	Dunbar	
1984	Wilson	Interhigh tournament champion; Dunbar won the regular-season championship.
1985	Spingarn	
1986	Coolidge	
1987	Dunbar	
1988	Coolidge	
1989	Dunbar	
1990	Dunbar	
1991	Dunbar	
1992	Anacostia	
1993	Dunbar	
1994	McKinley Tech	
1995	Cardozo	
1996	Anacostia	
1997	Anacostia	
1998	Anacostia	
1999	Dunbar	
2000	Spingarn	
2001	Spingarn	
2002	Spingarn	
2003	Dunbar	
2004	Cardozo	
2005	Cardozo	
2006	Cardozo	
2007	Cardozo	
2008	Theodore Roosevelt	
2009	Ballou	
2010	Ballou	
2011	Theodore Roosevelt	
2012	Coolidge	First league championship since 1988.
2013	Coolidge	Second consecutive championship.
2014	Theodore Roosevelt	Defeated H.D. Woodson, 77–50.
2015	H.D. Woodson	Defeated Coolidge, 42–36, for its first DCIAA boys' basketball championship.
2016	H.D. Woodson	Defeated Theodore Roosevelt, 68–57, for its second consecutive championship.
2017	Wilson	
2018	Wilson	
2019	Wilson	Defeated Theodore Roosevelt, 92–48, to win its third consecutive championship.
2020	Theodore Roosevelt	Defeated Wilson, 66–63.
2021	No championship held	The normal winter season was disrupted by the COVID-19 pandemic. DCIAA basketball activities did not resume until spring 2021.
2022	Wilson	Defeated Coolidge, 59–47. The school was formally renamed Jackson-Reed the following month.
2023	Bard	Defeated McKinley Tech, 54–44, for the program's first DCIAA championship.
2024	Jackson-Reed	Defeated Cardozo, 66–52.
2025	Cardozo	Defeated Jackson-Reed, 53–52, for its first championship since 2007.
2026	Theodore Roosevelt	Defeated Jackson-Reed, 74–65.

=== Championships by school ===
The following totals are based on the championship seasons listed above. Wilson and Jackson-Reed are counted as the same basketball program. The unidentified 1970 season is not included, and no championship was held in 2021.

School	Championships	Championship seasons
Dunbar	13	1975, 1976, 1978, 1979, 1981, 1983, 1987, 1989, 1990, 1991, 1993, 1999, 2003
Cardozo	12	1957, 1958, 1959, 1964, 1965, 1967, 1995, 2004, 2005, 2006, 2007, 2025
Spingarn	8	1960, 1961, 1980, 1982, 1985, 2000, 2001, 2002
Theodore Roosevelt	6	1972, 2008, 2011, 2014, 2020, 2026
Wilson/Jackson-Reed	6	1984, 2017, 2018, 2019, 2022, 2024
McKinley Tech	5	1966, 1968, 1969, 1977, 1994
Anacostia	4	1992, 1996, 1997, 1998
Coolidge	4	1986, 1988, 2012, 2013
Ballou	3	1971, 2009, 2010
Eastern	3	1962, 1963, 1974
H.D. Woodson	2	2015, 2016
Bard	1	2023
Western	1	1973

== Girls basketball championships (HS) ==
Historical Interhigh and DCIAA reporting sometimes distinguished between a regular-season league championship and a postseason tournament championship. The table below records the postseason or tournament champion when that designation was located. When a source identified only a league champion, that distinction is noted.

Only seasons for which reliable published documentation was located are included. Gaps in the table do not indicate that no championship was held. The Washington Post's year-by-year City Title results document the DCIAA public-school representatives from 1990 through 2012.

Documented Interhigh and DCIAA girls' basketball champions
Year	Champion	Notes
1973	Cardozo	Interhigh champion.
1975	Ballou	Defeated H.D. Woodson, 50–46, in the championship game.
1978	Ballou	Interhigh champion.
1979	H.D. Woodson	Interhigh champion.
1980	H.D. Woodson	Interhigh champion.
1983	H.D. Woodson	Finished 20–0 and won the Interhigh title.
1984	H.D. Woodson	Defeated Eastern in the championship game.
1985	H.D. Woodson	Defeated Theodore Roosevelt, 72–37, for its third consecutive tournament title.
1986	H.D. Woodson	Identified as the Interhigh league champion.
1988	Wilson	Identified as the Interhigh league champion.
1989	Theodore Roosevelt	Defeated Wilson, 61–59 in overtime, in the tournament championship.
1990	H.D. Woodson	Defeated Coolidge, 67–47, in the tournament championship.
1991	Coolidge	DCIAA representative in the Girls' City Title Game.
1992	H.D. Woodson	Defeated Anacostia, 56–26, for its third consecutive tournament championship.
1993	Wilson	DCIAA representative in the Girls' City Title Game.
1994	H.D. Woodson	Defeated Wilson, 38–36, in the tournament championship.
1995	Coolidge	Defeated Wilson, 69–46, in the tournament championship.
1996	Coolidge	Defeated H.D. Woodson, 49–46.
1997	H.D. Woodson	Defeated Anacostia, 56–54 in overtime.
1998	H.D. Woodson	Defeated Coolidge, 62–53.
1999	H.D. Woodson	Defeated Anacostia, 51–37.
2000	Anacostia	
2001	H.D. Woodson	
2002	Dunbar	
2003	H.D. Woodson	
2004	Theodore Roosevelt	
2005	Theodore Roosevelt	
2006	H.D. Woodson	
2007	H.D. Woodson	
2008	H.D. Woodson	
2009	H.D. Woodson	
2010	H.D. Woodson	
2011	H.D. Woodson	
2012	H.D. Woodson	Seventh consecutive DCIAA championship.
2013	H.D. Woodson	Eighth consecutive DCIAA championship.
2014	Bell (CHEC)	Defeated Wilson, 62–60.
2015	Anacostia	Defeated Wilson, 58–45.
2016	Wilson	Defeated Anacostia, 59–45.
2017	Anacostia	Defeated Bell, 67–44.
2018	Anacostia	Defeated Dunbar, 77–38.
2019	Dunbar	Defeated Wilson, 62–55.
2020	Dunbar	Defeated Banneker, 63–35.
2021	No championship held	The winter season was disrupted by the COVID-19 pandemic.
2022	Dunbar	Defeated Banneker, 61–49.
2023	Dunbar	Defeated Coolidge, 55–47.
2024	Dunbar	Defeated Eastern, 51–36, for its fifth consecutive championship.
2025	Coolidge	Defeated Eastern, 54–46.
2026	Coolidge	Defeated Jackson-Reed, 56–52.

== Girls Bowling Championships (HS) ==
- 2023 - Dunbar
- 2024 - Roosevelt
- 2025 - Bell (CHEC)

== Opportunity League Bowling Championships (HS) ==
- 2025 - Garnett-Patterson S.T.A.Y.

== Cheer Championships (HS) ==
- 2024 - Coolidge
- 2025 - Banneker

== Boys Cross Country Championships (HS) ==
- 2013 - Wilson
- 2014 - Wilson
- 2015 - Wilson
- 2016 - Wilson
- 2017 - Wilson
- 2018 - Wilson
- 2019 - Wilson
- 2021 - Wilson
- 2022 - Jackson-Reed (formerly known as Wilson)
- 2023 - Jackson-Reed
- 2024 - Jackson-Reed
- 2025 - School Without Walls

== Girls Cross Country Championships (HS) ==
- 2013 - Wilson
- 2014 - Wilson
- 2015 - Wilson
- 2016 - Wilson
- 2017 - Wilson
- 2018 - Wilson
- 2019 - Wilson
- 2021 - Wilson
- 2022 - Jackson-Reed (formerly known as Wilson)
- 2023 - Jackson-Reed
- 2024 - Jackson-Reed
- 2025 - School Without Walls

== Girls Golf Championships (HS) ==
- 2023 - McKinley Tech

== Boys Golf Championships (HS) ==
- 2023 - School Without Walls

== Girls Flag Football Championships (HS) ==
- 2023 - Coolidge
- 2024 - Eastern
- 2025 - Coolidge

== Boys Indoor Track & Field Championships (HS) ==
- 2010 - Coolidge
- 2011 - Dunbar
- 2012 - Dunbar
- 2015 - Wilson
- 2016 - Wilson
- 2017 - Wilson
- 2018 - Wilson
- 2019 - Wilson
- 2023 - McKinley Tech
- 2024 - McKinley Tech
- 2025 - McKinley Tech

== Girls Indoor Track & Field Championships (HS) ==
- 2010 - Dunbar
- 2011 - Dunbar
- 2012 - Dunbar
- 2015 - McKinley Tech
- 2016 - Wilson
- 2017 - Wilson
- 2018 - Wilson
- 2019 - Dunbar
- 2023 - Dunbar
- 2024 - Dunbar
- 2025 - Jackson-Reed

== Boys Outdoor Track & Field Championships (HS) ==
- 2005 - HD Woodson
- 2007 - Dunbar
- 2009 - Ballou
- 2010 - Coolidge
- 2011 - Dunbar
- 2012 - Dunbar
- 2013 - Dunbar
- 2016 - Wilson
- 2017 - Wilson
- 2018 - McKinley Tech
- 2019 - Wilson
- 2022 - McKinley Tech
- 2023 - McKinley Tech
- 2024 - McKinley Tech
- 2025 - McKinley Tech

== Girls Outdoor Track & Field Championships (HS) ==
- 2005 - Ballou
- 2007 - Anacostia
- 2009 - Dunbar
- 2011 - Dunbar
- 2012 - Dunbar
- 2013 - Dunbar
- 2016 - Wilson
- 2017 - Wilson
- 2018 - Dunbar
- 2019 - Dunbar
- 2022 - Jackson-Reed (formerly known as Wilson)
- 2023 - Dunbar
- 2024 - Jackson-Reed
- 2025 - Jackson-Reed

== Boys Soccer Championships (HS) ==
- 2022 - Jackson-Reed (formerly known as Wilson)
- 2023 - Jackson-Reed
- 2024 - Coolidge
- 2025 - Jackson-Reed

== Girls Soccer Championships (HS) ==
- 2022 - Jackson-Reed (formerly known as Wilson)
- 2023 - School Without Walls
- 2024 - Jackson-Reed
- 2025 - Jackson-Reed

== Girls Softball Championships (HS) ==
- 2023 - Jackson-Reed
- 2024 - Jackson-Reed
- 2025 - Jackson-Reed

== Boys Swimming Championships (HS) ==
- 2024 - Jackson-Reed
- 2025 - Jackson-Reed

== Girls Swimming Championships (HS) ==
- 2024 - Jackson-Reed
- 2025 - Jackson-Reed

== Girls Volleyball Championships (HS) ==
- 2022 - Jackson-Reed (formerly known as Wilson)
- 2023 - Jackson-Reed
- 2024 - Jackson-Reed
- 2025 - School Without Walls

== Co-Ed Wrestling Championships (HS) ==
- 2023 - H.D. Woodson
- 2024 - Jackson-Reed
- 2025 - H.D. Woodson

== Middle School Sports ==
The DCIAA sponsors middle school varsity competition in nine boys', ten girls' and six co-ed sanctioned sports (including one adaptive and one unified sports). Student-athletes in grades 6-8 are eligible to participate in middle school sports.

=== Middle school teams in DCIAA competition ===
Sports	Boys	Girls	Co-Ed
Adaptive Bowling	-	-	1
Archery	-	-	8
Baseball	8	-	-
Basketball	22	21	-
Bowling	-	8	-
Cheer	-	-	16
Cross Country	12	12	-
Football	10	-	-
Golf	-	-	3
Indoor Track & Field	14	14	-
Lacrosse	2	4	-
Outdoor Track	20	20	-
Soccer	12	9	-
Softball	-	8	-
Swimming	8	8	-
Unified Basketball	-	-	4
Volleyball	-	15	-
Wrestling	-	-	3

=== Middle School Boys' varsity sponsored sports by school ===
School	Baseball	Basketball	Cross Country	Football	Indoor Track	Lacrosse	Outdoor Track	Soccer	Swimming	Total DCIAA Sports
Brookland	No	Yes	Yes	Yes	Yes	No	Yes	No	Yes	6
Browne	No	Yes	Yes	No	No	No	Yes	Yes	Yes	5
Cap Hill Montessori @ Logan	No	Yes	No	No	Yes	No	Yes	No	No	3
Cardozo	No	Yes	No	No	No	No	Yes	Yes	No	3
Deal	Yes	Yes	Yes	No	Yes	Yes	Yes	Yes	Yes	8
Eliot-Hine	Yes	Yes	Yes	No	Yes	No	Yes	Yes	Yes	7
Francis	No	Yes	Yes	No	Yes	No	Yes	No	No	4
Hardy	Yes	Yes	Yes	Yes	Yes	Yes	Yes	Yes	Yes	9
Hart	Yes	Yes	Yes	Yes	Yes	No	Yes	No	No	6
Ida B. Wells	No	Yes	No	No	Yes	No	Yes	Yes	Yes	5
Jefferson	Yes	Yes	Yes	Yes	Yes	No	Yes	No	No	6
Johnson	Yes	Yes	No	Yes	Yes	No	Yes	No	No	5
Kelly Miller	No	Yes	No	No	Yes	No	Yes	No	No	4
Kramer	No	Yes	No	Yes	No	No	Yes	No	No	2
Leckie	No	Yes	No	No	No	No	No	No	No	1
Lincoln (CHEC)	No	Yes	Yes	Yes	Yes	No	Yes	Yes	No	6
MacFarland	No	Yes	No	No	No	No	Yes	No	No	2
McKinley MS	No	Yes	No	Yes	Yes	No	Yes	No	No	4
Oyster-Adams	No	Yes	Yes	No	No	No	Yes	Yes	Yes	5
Sousa	Yes	Yes	No	Yes	No	No	No	No	No	3
Stuart-Hobson	Yes	Yes	Yes	Yes	Yes	No	Yes	Yes	Yes	8
Walker-Jones	No	No	No	No	No	No	No	No	No	0
Wheatley	No	Yes	No	No	No	No	Yes	Yes	No	3
Total Teams	8	22	12	10	14	2	20	10	8	105

=== Middle School Girls' varsity sponsored sports by school ===
School	Basketball	Bowling	Cross Country	Indoor Track	Lacrosse	Outdoor Track	Soccer	Softball	Swimming	Volleyball	Total DCIAA Sports
Brookland	Yes	Yes	Yes	Yes	No	Yes	No	No	Yes	Yes	7
Browne	Yes	Yes	Yes	No	No	Yes	No	No	Yes	Yes	6
Cap Hill Montessori @ Logan	Yes	No	No	Yes	No	Yes	No	No	No	No	3
Cardozo	Yes	Yes	No	No	No	Yes	Yes	No	No	No	4
Deal	Yes	No	Yes	Yes	Yes	Yes	Yes	Yes	Yes	Yes	9
Eliot-Hine	Yes	Yes	Yes	Yes	No	Yes	Yes	Yes	Yes	No	8
Excel	No	No	No	Yes	No	No	No	No	No	No	1
Francis	Yes	No	Yes	No	Yes	Yes	No	No	No	No	4
Hardy	Yes	No	Yes	Yes	Yes	Yes	Yes	Yes	Yes	Yes	9
Hart	Yes	No	No	Yes	No	Yes	No	Yes	No	Yes	5
Ida B. Wells	Yes	No	No	Yes	No	Yes	Yes	No	Yes	No	5
Jefferson	Yes	Yes	Yes	Yes	No	Yes	No	Yes	No	Yes	7
Johnson	Yes	No	No	Yes	No	Yes	No	Yes	No	Yes	5
Kelly Miller	Yes	No	No	Yes	No	Yes	No	No	No	Yes	4
Kramer	Yes	No	No	No	No	Yes	No	No	No	Yes	3
Leckie	Yes	Yes	No	No	No	No	No	No	No	Yes	3
Lincoln (CHEC)	Yes	No	Yes	Yes	Yes	Yes	Yes	Yes	No	Yes	8
MacFarland	Yes	No	No	No	No	Yes	Yes	No	No	No	3
McKinley MS	Yes	No	No	Yes	No	Yes	No	No	No	Yes	4
Oyster-Adams	Yes	No	Yes	No	No	Yes	Yes	No	Yes	Yes	6
Sousa	Yes	No	No	No	No	No	No	Yes	No	Yes	3
Stuart-Hobson	Yes	Yes	Yes	Yes	No	Yes	Yes	No	Yes	Yes	8
Walker-Jones	No	No	No	No	No	No	No	No	No	No	0
Wheatley	No	Yes	No	No	No	Yes	No	No	No	No	2
Total Teams	21	8	10	14	4	20	9	8	8	15	117

=== Middle School Co-Ed varsity sponsored sports by school ===
School	Adaptive Bowling	Archery	Cheer	Golf	Unified Basketball	Wrestling	Total DCIAA Sports
Brookland	No	No	Yes	No	Yes	No	2
Browne	No	Yes	Yes	Yes	No	No	3
Cap Hill Montessori @ Logan	No	No	No	No	No	No	0
Cardozo	No	No	No	No	No	No	0
Deal	No	Yes	Yes	No	No	Yes	3
Eliot-Hine	No	Yes	Yes	Yes	Yes	No	4
Excel	No	No	Yes	No	No	No	1
Francis	No	No	No	No	No	No	0
Hardy	No	Yes	Yes	No	No	No	2
Hart	No	No	Yes	No	No	No	1
Ida B. Wells	No	No	Yes	No	No	No	1
Jefferson	No	No	Yes	No	No	No	1
Johnson	No	Yes	Yes	No	No	Yes	3
Kelly Miller	No	No	Yes	No	No	No	1
Kramer	No	No	Yes	No	No	No	1
Leckie	No	No	No	No	No	No	0
Lincoln (CHEC)	No	No	No	Yes	No	Yes	2
MacFarland	No	No	Yes	No	No	No	1
McKinley MS	No	No	Yes	No	No	No	1
Oyster-Adams	No	No	No	No	No	No	0
Sousa	No	No	No	No	Yes	No	1
Stuart-Hobson	Yes	Yes	Yes	No	Yes	No	4
Walker-Jones	No	No	No	No	No	No	0
Wheatley	No	Yes	Yes	No	No	No	2
Total Teams	1	8	16	3	4	3	34

== Elementary School Sports ==
The DCIAA sponsors elementary school varsity competition in four boys', four girls' and three co-ed sanctioned sports. Student-athletes in grades 4 and 5 are eligible to participate in elementary sports.

=== Elementary school teams in DCIAA competition ===
Sports	Boys	Girls	Co-Ed
Basketball	39	31	-
Cheer	-	-	26
Cross Country	28	28	-
Flag Football	-	-	24
Indoor Track & Field	12	12	-
Outdoor Track	30	30	-
Soccer	-	-	19

=== Elementary School Boys' varsity sponsored sports by school ===
School	Basketball	Cross Country	Indoor Track	Outdoor Track	Total DCIAA Sports
Amidon-Bowen	Yes	Yes	Yes	Yes	4
Bancroft	No	No	No	No	0
Barnard	No	No	No	No	0
Beers	No	Yes	No	No	1
Brent	No	Yes	No	Yes	2
Brightwood	Yes	No	No	No	1
Browne	Yes	No	Yes	Yes	3
Bruce-Monroe @ Park View	No	Yes	No	Yes	2
Bunker Hill	No	No	No	No	0
Burroughs	No	No	No	No	0
Burrville	Yes	No	No	No	1
C.W. Harris	No	No	No	No	0
Cap Hill Montessori @ Logan	Yes	No	Yes	Yes	3
Cleveland	Yes	No	No	No	1
Chisholm	Yes	Yes	No	No	2
Dorothy I. Height	Yes	No	No	No	1
Drew	Yes	Yes	Yes	Yes	4
Eaton	Yes	No	No	No	1
Francis	No	Yes	No	Yes	2
Garfield	Yes	No	No	No	1
Garrison	Yes	No	No	No	1
H. D. Cooke	No	No	No	No	0
Hearst	Yes	Yes	No	Yes	3
Hendley	Yes	No	Yes	Yes	3
Houston	Yes	No	No	No	1
Hyde-Addison	Yes	No	No	Yes	2
J. O. Wilson	Yes	Yes	Yes	Yes	4
Janney	Yes	Yes	No	No	2
John Lewis	No	No	No	Yes	1
Ketcham	No	No	No	No	0
Key	No	No	No	No	0
Kimball	Yes	No	No	No	1
Lafayette	Yes	Yes	No	Yes	3
Langdon	No	No	Yes	Yes	2
Langley	No	No	No	No	0
LaSalle-Backus	No	No	No	No	0
Lawrence E. Boone	Yes	Yes	No	Yes	3
Leckie	No	No	No	No	0
Lorraine H. Whitlock	Yes	No	No	No	1
Ludlow-Taylor	Yes	Yes	No	No	2
Malcolm X @ Green	No	No	No	No	0
Mann	No	No	No	No	0
Marie Reed	No	No	No	Yes	1
Martin Luther King	Yes	No	No	No	1
Maury	Yes	Yes	No	No	2
Miner	Yes	No	No	Yes	2
Moten	No	No	No	No	0
Murch	Yes	Yes	No	Yes	3
Nalle	No	No	No	No	0
Noyes	No	No	No	No	0
Oyster-Adams	Yes	Yes	No	Yes	3
Patterson	No	No	No	No	0
Payne	Yes	No	No	No	1
Plummer	No	No	No	No	0
Powell	No	Yes	Yes	Yes	3
Randall Highlands	Yes	No	No	Yes	2
Raymond	Yes	Yes	Yes	Yes	4
Ross	No	Yes	No	Yes	2
Savoy	Yes	No	Yes	Yes	3
School-Within-School @ Goding	Yes	No	No	No	1
Seaton	No	No	No	No	0
Shepherd	No	No	No	No	0
Simon	No	No	No	No	0
Smothers	No	No	No	No	0
Stanton	No	No	No	No	0
Stoddert	Yes	Yes	Yes	Yes	4
Takoma	Yes	No	No	Yes	2
Thomas	No	No	No	No	0
Thomson	No	No	No	No	0
Truesdell	No	No	No	No	0
Tubman	Yes	No	No	Yes	2
Turner	Yes	No	No	No	1
Van Ness	No	No	No	No	0
Walker-Jones	No	No	No	No	0
Watkins	Yes	No	No	No	1
Wheatley	Yes	No	No	No	1
Whittier	No	No	Yes	Yes	2
Total Teams	39	20	12	28	99

=== Elementary School Girls' varsity sponsored sports by school ===
School	Basketball	Cross Country	Indoor Track	Outdoor Track	Total DCIAA Sports
Amidon-Bowen	Yes	Yes	Yes	Yes	4
Bancroft	No	No	No	No	0
Barnard	No	No	No	No	0
Beers	No	Yes	No	No	1
Brent	No	Yes	No	Yes	2
Brightwood	Yes	No	No	No	1
Browne	Yes	No	Yes	Yes	3
Bruce-Monroe @ Park View	No	Yes	No	Yes	2
Bunker Hill	No	No	No	No	0
Burroughs	No	No	No	No	0
Burrville	Yes	No	No	No	1
C.W. Harris	Yes	No	No	No	1
Cap Hill Montessori @ Logan	Yes	No	Yes	Yes	3
Cleveland	No	No	No	No	0
Chisholm	No	Yes	No	No	1
Dorothy I. Height	No	No	No	No	0
Drew	Yes	Yes	Yes	Yes	4
Eaton	Yes	No	No	No	1
Excel	No	No	No	No	0
Francis	Yes	Yes	No	Yes	3
Garfield	Yes	No	No	No	1
Garrison	Yes	No	No	No	1
H. D. Cooke	No	No	No	No	0
Hearst	Yes	Yes	No	Yes	3
Hendley	Yes	Yes	Yes	Yes	4
Houston	Yes	No	No	No	1
Hyde-Addison	No	No	No	Yes	1
J. O. Wilson	No	Yes	Yes	Yes	3
Janney	Yes	Yes	No	No	2
John Lewis	No	No	No	Yes	1
Ketcham	No	No	No	No	0
Key	No	No	No	No	0
Kimball	No	No	No	Yes	1
Lafayette	Yes	Yes	No	Yes	3
Langdon	No	No	Yes	Yes	2
Langley	No	No	No	No	0
LaSalle-Backus	No	No	No	Yes	2
Lawrence E. Boone	Yes	Yes	No	Yes	3
Leckie	No	No	No	No	0
Lorraine H. Whitlock	No	No	No	No	0
Ludlow-Taylor	Yes	Yes	No	No	2
Malcolm X @ Green	No	No	No	No	0
Mann	No	No	No	No	0
Marie Reed	No	No	No	Yes	1
Martin Luther King	Yes	No	No	No	1
Maury	Yes	Yes	No	No	2
Miner	No	No	No	Yes	1
Moten	No	No	No	No	0
Murch	Yes	Yes	No	Yes	3
Nalle	No	No	No	No	0
Noyes	No	Yes	No	No	1
Oyster-Adams	Yes	Yes	No	Yes	3
Patterson	No	No	No	No	0
Payne	Yes	No	No	No	1
Plummer	No	No	No	No	0
Powell	No	Yes	Yes	Yes	3
Randall Highlands	Yes	No	No	Yes	2
Raymond	Yes	Yes	Yes	Yes	4
Ross	No	Yes	No	Yes	2
Savoy	Yes	No	Yes	Yes	3
School-Within-School @ Goding	No	No	No	No	0
Seaton	No	No	No	No	0
Shepherd	No	No	No	No	0
Simon	No	No	No	No	0
Smothers	No	No	No	No	0
Stanton	No	No	No	No	0
Stoddert	Yes	Yes	Yes	Yes	4
Takoma	Yes	No	No	Yes	2
Thomas	No	No	No	No	0
Thomson	No	No	No	No	0
Truesdell	No	No	No	No	0
Tubman	No	No	No	Yes	1
Turner	No	No	No	No	0
Van Ness	No	No	No	No	0
Walker-Jones	No	No	No	No	0
Watkins	No	No	No	No	0
Wheatley	No	No	No	No	0
Whittier	No	No	Yes	Yes	2
Total Teams	28	22	12	30	93

=== Elementary School Co-Ed varsity sponsored sports by school ===
School	Cheer	Flag Football	Soccer	Total DCIAA Sports
Amidon-Bowen	Yes	Yes	Yes	3
Bancroft	No	No	No	0
Barnard	No	No	No	0
Beers	Yes	No	Yes	2
Brent	No	No	No	0
Brightwood	No	No	No	0
Browne	No	Yes	Yes	2
Bruce-Monroe @ Park View	No	No	Yes	1
Bunker Hill	No	No	No	0
Burroughs	No	Yes	No	1
Burrville	No	No	No	0
C.W. Harris	No	Yes	No	1
Cap Hill Montessori @ Logan	No	No	No	0
Cleveland	Yes	Yes	Yes	3
Chisholm	No	Yes	No	1
Dorothy I. Height	No	Yes	Yes	2
Drew	Yes	Yes	No	2
Eaton	No	No	No	0
Excel	No	No	No	0
Francis	No	Yes	No	1
Garfield	Yes	Yes	No	2
Garrison	Yes	Yes	No	2
H. D. Cooke	No	No	No	0
Hearst	No	No	No	0
Hendley	Yes	Yes	No	2
Houston	No	Yes	No	1
Hyde-Addison	No	No	No	0
J. O. Wilson	Yes	No	Yes	2
Janney	No	No	No	0
John Lewis	No	No	No	0
Ketcham	No	No	No	0
Key	No	No	No	0
Kimball	Yes	No	No	1
Lafayette	No	No	No	0
Langdon	No	No	Yes	1
Langley	No	No	Yes	1
LaSalle-Backus	No	No	No	0
Lawrence E. Boone	Yes	No	No	1
Leckie	No	No	No	0
Lorraine H. Whitlock	Yes	No	No	1
Ludlow-Taylor	No	No	Yes	1
Malcolm X @ Green	No	No	No	0
Mann	No	No	No	0
Marie Reed	No	No	No	0
Martin Luther King	Yes	No	No	1
Maury	No	No	Yes	1
Miner	No	No	No	0
Moten	No	No	No	0
Murch	No	No	No	0
Nalle	No	No	No	0
Noyes	Yes	Yes	Yes	3
Oyster-Adams	No	No	No	0
Patterson	No	No	No	0
Payne	No	Yes	Yes	2
Plummer	No	No	No	0
Powell	No	No	No	0
Randall Highlands	Yes	Yes	No	2
Raymond	No	Yes	Yes	2
Ross	No	No	No	0
Savoy	Yes	No	Yes	2
School-Within-School @ Goding	No	No	Yes	1
Seaton	No	No	No	0
Shepherd	Yes	No	Yes	2
Simon	No	No	No	0
Smothers	No	No	No	0
Stanton	No	Yes	No	1
Stoddert	No	No	No	0
Takoma	No	No	Yes	1
Thomas	No	No	No	0
Thomson	No	No	No	0
Truesdell	No	No	No	0
Tubman	Yes	Yes	No	2
Turner	No	Yes	No	1
Van Ness	No	No	No	0
Walker-Jones	No	No	No	0
Watkins	Yes	No	Yes	2
Wheatley	No	Yes	No	1
Whittier	No	Yes	Yes	3
Total Teams	18	22	20	60

== Opportunity League Academy Sports ==
The DCIAA sponsors opportunity league academy varsity competition in two boys', two girls' and one co-ed sanctioned sports. Student-athletes in grades 9-12, and adult learners are eligible to participate in opportunity league academy sports. The age range for student-athletes in this league are 16-22.

=== Opportunity League Academy teams in DCIAA competition ===
Sports	Boys	Girls	Co-Ed
Basketball	3	3	-
Bowling	-	-	2
Outdoor Track	1	1	-

=== Opportunity League Academy Boys' varsity sponsored sports by school ===
School	Basketball	Outdoor Track	Total DCIAA Sports
Ballou S.T.A.Y.	Yes	No	1
Garnett-Patterson S.T.A.Y.	Yes	Yes	2
Luke C. Moore	Yes	No	1
Total Teams	3	1	4

=== Opportunity League Academy Girls' varsity sponsored sports by school ===
School	Basketball	Outdoor Track	Total DCIAA Sports
Ballou S.T.A.Y.	Yes	No	1
Garnett-Patterson S.T.A.Y.	Yes	Yes	2
Luke C. Moore	Yes	No	1
Total Teams	3	1	4

=== Opportunity League Academy Co-Ed varsity sponsored sports by school ===
School	Bowling	Total DCIAA Sports
Ballou S.T.A.Y.	Yes	1
Garnett-Patterson S.T.A.Y.	Yes	1
Luke C. Moore	No	0
Total Teams	2	2

== Former Schools ==
- Spingarn High School-Closed in 2013
- Western High School-Now Duke Ellington School of the Arts

== Alumni ==
=== Baseball ===
- Emmanuel Burriss, San Francisco Giants infielder (Wilson '02)
- Maury Wills, former Major League Baseball shortstop/manager (Cardozo '51)

=== Basketball ===
- Elgin Baylor, NBA Hall of Famer (Spingarn '53)
- Dave Bing, NBA Hall of Famer (Spingarn '62)
- Jerry Chambers, former NBA forward (Eastern '62)
- Sherman Douglas, former NBA player (Spingarn '85)
- Gene Littles, former NBA player and head coach (McKinley '61)
- Ben Warley, former NBA player (Phelps '57)
- Kermit Washington, former NBA player (Coolidge '70)

=== Football ===
- Marvin Austin, Former NFL defensive tackle (Ballou '07)
- Arrelious Benn, Philadelphia Eagles wide receiver/kick returner (Dunbar '07)
- Willie J. Bennett, Jr., Former NCAA Football Coach/Current Assistant AD for DCIAA (H.D. Woodson '97)
- Orlando Brown Sr., Former NFL Player (H.D Woodson)
- Joshua Cribbs, Cleveland Browns wide receiver/kick returner (Dunbar '01)
- Vernon Davis, San Francisco 49ers tight end (Dunbar '02)
- Cato June, Indianapolis Colts linebacker (Anacostia '98)
- Byron Leftwich, NFL quarterback (H.D. Woodson '98)
- Josh Morgan, Washington Redskins wide receiver/kick returner (H.D. Woodson '04)
- Lovell Pinkney, St. Louis Rams wide receiver (Anacostia '92)
- Jerry Porter, Oakland Raiders wide receiver (Coolidge '97)
- Larry Pinkard, NFL wide receiver (Ballou '10)
- Reggie Rucker, former NFL wide receiver Dallas Cowboys, New York Giants, New England Patriots, Cleveland Browns (Anacostia '65)

=== NASCAR ===
- Rajah Caruth, professional stock car racing driver; ran track and cross country in high school (School Without Walls '20)

== See also ==
- NFHS
