= Orlando Brown (American football, born 1970) =

American football player (1970–2011)

No. 77, 78
- Position: Offensive tackle

Personal information
- Born: November 12, 1970; Washington, D.C., U.S.
- Died: September 23, 2011 (aged 40); Baltimore, Maryland, U.S.
- Listed height: 6 ft 7 in (2.01 m)
- Listed weight: 360 lb (163 kg)

Career information
- High school: H.D. Woodson (Washington, D.C.)
- College: South Carolina State
- NFL draft: 1993: undrafted

Career history
- Cleveland Browns (1993–1995); Baltimore Ravens (1996–1998); Cleveland Browns (1999–2000); Baltimore Ravens (2003–2005)

Career NFL statistics
- Games played: 129
- Games started: 119
- Fumble recoveries: 3
- Stats at Pro Football Reference

Orlando Claude Brown Sr. (November 12, 1970 – September 23, 2011) was an American professional football player who played offensive tackle in the National Football League (NFL) for the Baltimore Ravens and Cleveland Browns. He attended Howard D. Woodson High School. He played college football for Willie Jeffries at South Carolina State University. He was nicknamed "Zeus".

== Early life ==
Brown was born in 1970 in Washington, D.C. Brown attended H. D. Woodson Senior High School. He went to South Carolina State University and played offensive tackle.

== Professional career ==
=== Cleveland Browns (first stint) ===
Brown signed with the Cleveland Browns as an undrafted free agent in 1993. He spent three seasons with the Browns.

=== Baltimore Ravens (first stint) ===
In 1996, the Browns franchise was moved by owner Art Modell to Baltimore, becoming the Baltimore Ravens. In his first stint as a Raven, Brown who, at 6-foot-7, 360 pounds, was known as an energetic and intimidating player, earned the nickname "Zeus". In his prime he was one of the highest-paid offensive linemen in the NFL.

=== Cleveland Browns (second stint) ===
Brown was signed as an unrestricted free agent by the reactivated Cleveland Browns before the 1999 season. During a December 19, 1999, game against the Jacksonville Jaguars, Brown was hit in the right eye by a penalty flag weighted with ball bearings thrown by referee Jeff Triplette. Triplette immediately apologized to Brown. Brown left the game temporarily, then returned to the field only to shove Triplette, knocking him to the ground. Brown was ejected from the game and had to be escorted off the field by his teammates. Brown was subsequently suspended by the NFL, but the suspension was lifted when the severity of his injury became apparent. Brown missed three seasons due to temporary blindness. Brown was one of only three players to have played for the original Cleveland Browns and the Browns after the team was revived in 1999, as most of the Browns roster was moved to Baltimore. The others are Jerry Ball and Antonio Langham.

=== Out of football, injuries, and lawsuits ===
Brown sat out the entire 2000 NFL season waiting for his right eye to heal; he spent time on the physically unable to perform list before Cleveland released him three weeks into the regular season.

In 2001, he sued the NFL for $200 million in damages. According to reports, he settled for a sum between $15 million and $25 million in 2002.

=== Baltimore Ravens (second stint) ===
Brown spent the 2001 and 2002 seasons in rehabilitation before he was picked back up by the Ravens in 2003. During the 2003 season, Brown started at both offensive and defensive tackle in a game against the Oakland Raiders. He remained with the team until being released in March 2006. Following his retirement, Brown retained ties with the Ravens and mentored players.

== Personal life and death ==
After retiring from football, Brown went into the restaurant business, and became the owner of the first Fatburger franchise in Maryland.

In September 2009, Brown was arrested and charged with third-degree burglary and destruction of property. The charges were later dropped.

He had two daughters and three sons, including Orlando Brown Jr.

On September 23, 2011, Brown was found dead in his Baltimore townhouse. The state medical examiner ruled that Brown died of diabetic ketoacidosis, an ailment common among diabetics and caused by high blood sugar and lack of insulin.
