= Marcus Spriggs =

American football player (born 1974)

No. 69, 76, 79
- Positions: Guard, tackle

Personal information
- Born: May 30, 1974 (age 52); Hattiesburg, Mississippi, U.S.
- Listed height: 6 ft 3 in (1.91 m)
- Listed weight: 310 lb (141 kg)

Career information
- High school: Byram (MS)
- College: Hinds CC; Houston
- NFL draft: 1997: 6th round, 185th overall pick

Career history
- Buffalo Bills (1997–2000); Miami Dolphins (2001–2002); Green Bay Packers (2003); Washington Redskins (2004)*
- * Offseason or practice squad member only

Career NFL statistics
- Games played: 49
- Games started: 18
- Stats at Pro Football Reference

Thomas Marcus Spriggs (born May 30, 1974) is an American former professional football player who was an offensive guard in the National Football League (NFL). He played college football for the Houston Cougars and was selected in the sixth round of the 1997 NFL draft with the 185th overall pick. He played from 1997 to 2003 for the Buffalo Bills, Miami Dolphins, and Green Bay Packers.
