= Josh Morgan =

American football player (born 1985)

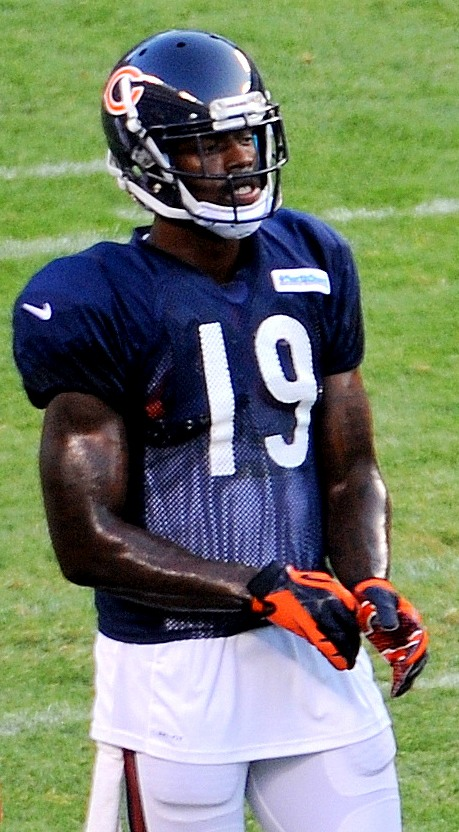
- Morgan with the Chicago Bears in 2014

No. 84, 15, 19
- Position: Wide receiver

Personal information
- Born: June 20, 1985 (age 41); Washington, D.C., U.S.
- Listed height: 6 ft 0 in (1.83 m)
- Listed weight: 218 lb (99 kg)

Career information
- High school: H. D. Woodson (Washington, D.C.)
- College: Virginia Tech (2004–2007)
- NFL draft: 2008: 6th round, 174th overall pick

Career history
- San Francisco 49ers (2008–2011); Washington Redskins (2012–2013); Chicago Bears (2014); New Orleans Saints (2015)*
- * Offseason or practice squad member only

Career NFL statistics
- Receptions: 209
- Receiving yards: 2,558
- Receiving touchdowns: 12
- Stats at Pro Football Reference

Joshua Lewis Morgan (born June 20, 1985) is an American former professional football player who was a wide receiver in the National Football League (NFL). He was selected by the San Francisco 49ers in the sixth round of the 2008 NFL draft. He played college football for the Virginia Tech Hokies. He also played for the Washington Redskins and Chicago Bears.

== Early life ==
Morgan played quarterback, wide receiver and cornerback at Eastern Senior High School in Washington, D.C. before transferring to H.D. Woodson High School for his senior year. During his senior season, he accumulated eight catches for 275 yards and three touchdowns in a game against Glen Mills (Pa.) High School. He passed for 987 yards and rushed for 898 during his junior year, and finished with five passing and eight rushing touchdowns. He also played basketball and was named the most valuable player in two of the tournaments his team participated in.

== College career ==
Morgan ranks fourth in Virginia Tech history with 122 receptions, eighth with 1,817 receiving yards (a 14.9 avg.) and fifth with 16 touchdowns. He finished his career with 2,435 all-purpose yards.

During his senior season in 2007, Morgan led the team with a career-high 46 catches for 552 yards (a 12.0 avg) and five touchdowns, while playing alongside wide receivers Eddie Royal and Justin Harper. In 2006, he finished second on the team with 33 receptions for 448 yards (a 13.6 avg.) and four touchdowns.

As a sophomore in 2005, he finished with 28 catches for 571 yards (a 16.8 avg.) and four touchdowns. During his freshman season in 2004, he caught 15 passes for 346 yards (a 23.1 avg.) and three touchdowns. Morgan's 126 yards receiving vs. Auburn in the 2005 Sugar Bowl set a school bowl game record.

== Professional career ==
Pre-draft measurables
Height	Weight	40-yard dash	10-yard split	20-yard split	20-yard shuttle	Three-cone drill	Vertical jump	Broad jump	Bench press
6 ft 0 in (1.83 m)	219 lb (99 kg)	4.47 s	1.49 s	2.58 s	4.29 s	7.06 s	40.5 in (1.03 m)	10 ft 0 in (3.05 m)	14 reps
All values from NFL Combine

=== San Francisco 49ers ===
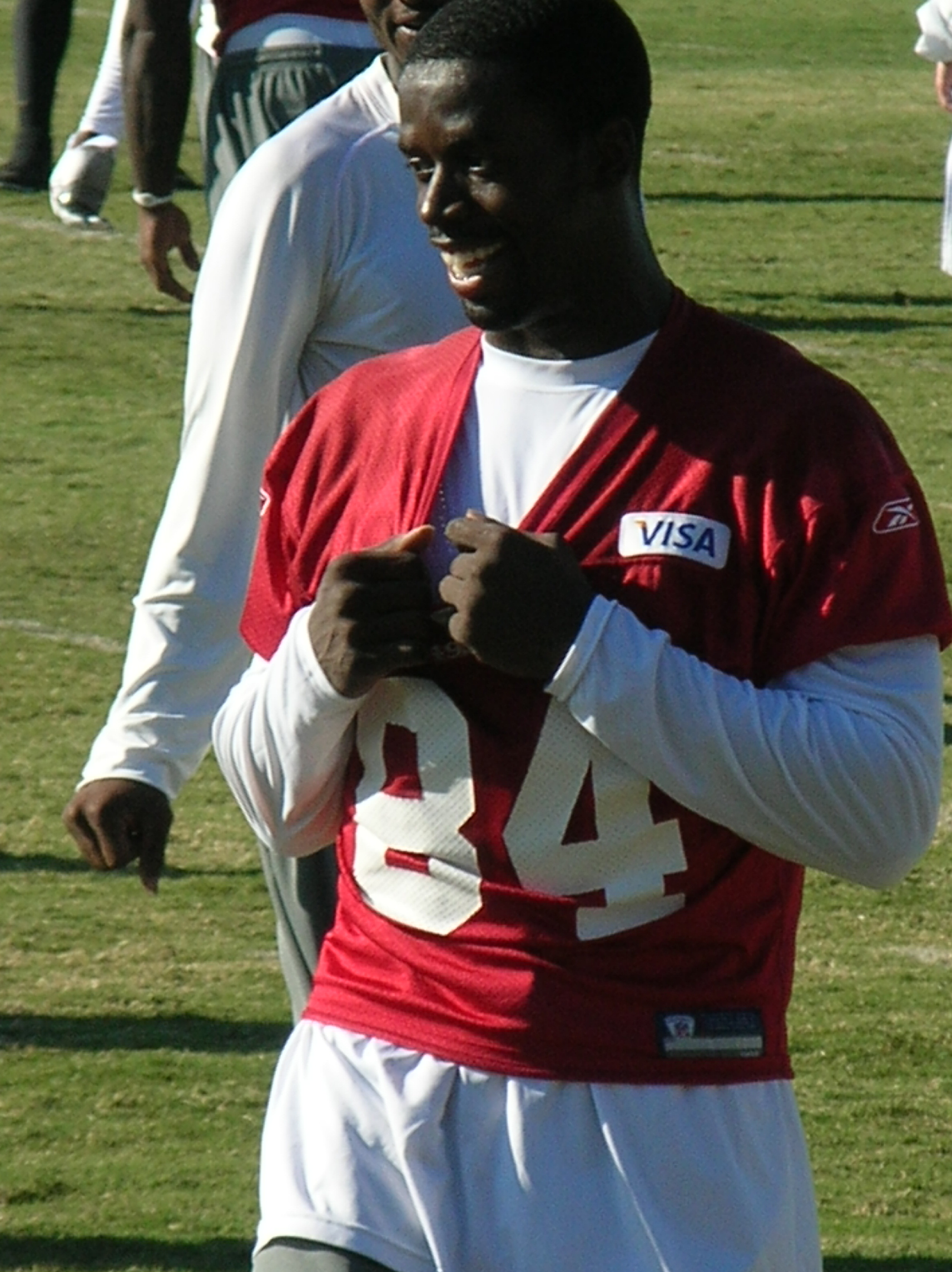
Morgan at 49ers training camp in August 2010.

==== 2008 season ====
In 2008, Morgan's preseason performances won him a place on the final 53-man roster. He became ill just before the season and lost 15 pounds. Morgan made his NFL debut in Week 1 against the Arizona Cardinals. In Week 7 against the New York Giants, he caught five passes for 86 yards and scored his first touchdown. The week after, he had his first career start. After suffering a one-inch tear in his groin in November, he missed the next four games. Playing in only 12 games, Morgan showed real promise as he finished his rookie season with 20 receptions for 319 yards and three touchdown receptions.

==== 2009 season ====
Morgan was made a starter by Week 1 of the 2009 season. In October, after the 49ers had finally signed their 2009 first-round draft pick (wide receiver Michael Crabtree), it was assumed that Morgan might lose his starting job to the rookie. Instead, Morgan retained his starting position and played alongside Crabtree. By the end of his second season, he played in all 16 games, starting 15 of them, and recorded 52 receptions for 527 yards and three touchdowns.

==== 2010 season ====
In his third season, Morgan recorded a career-high of 698 receiving yards on only 44 receptions. He also scored two touchdowns.

==== 2011 season ====
On October 11, 2011, Morgan was placed on the injured reserve list after a promising start to the 2011 season due to a broken bone in his right leg. He finished the season with 15 receptions, 220 yards, and one touchdown in just five games.

=== Washington Redskins ===
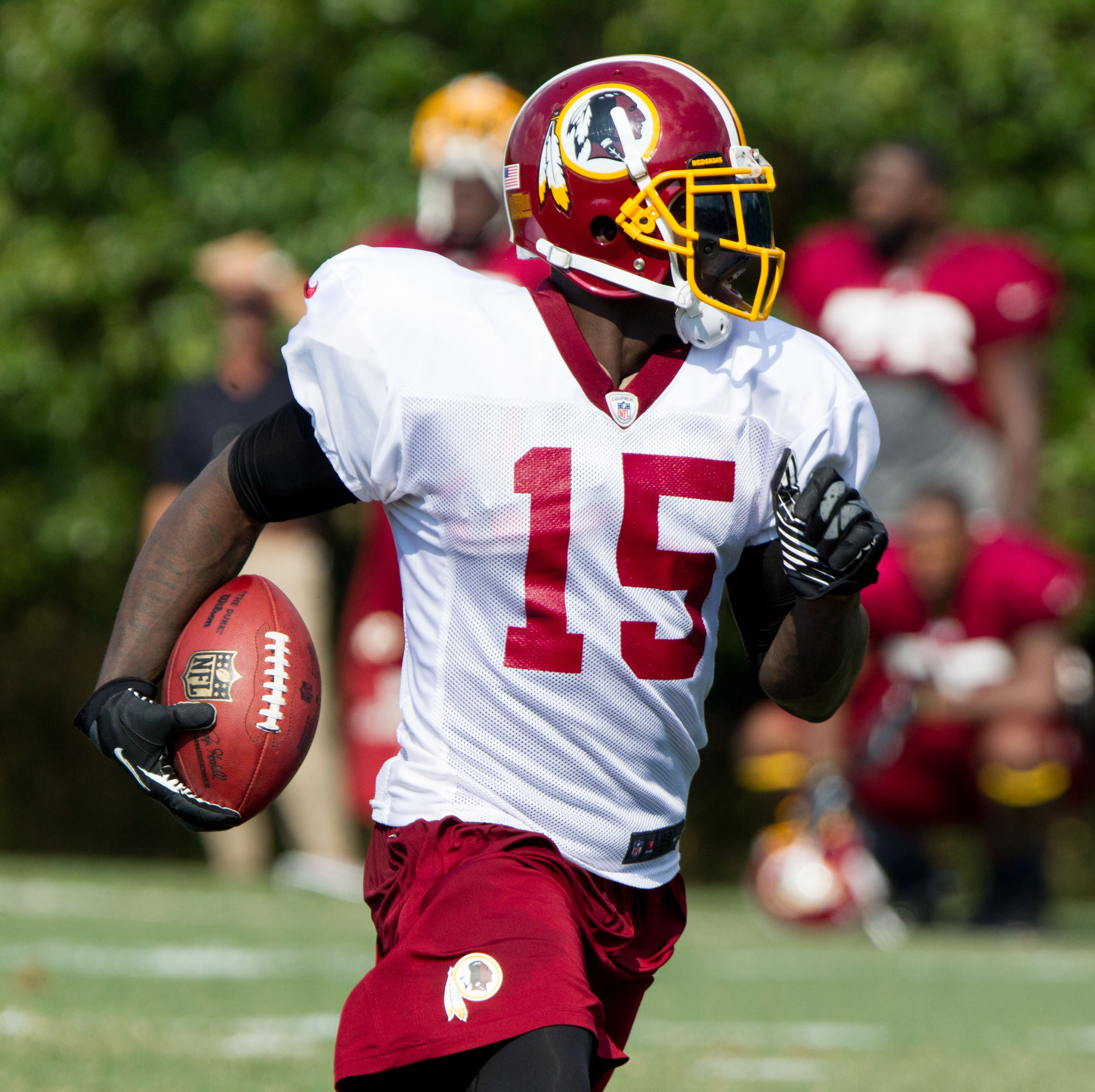
Morgan at the Redskins' training camp in 2012.

==== 2012 season ====
Morgan signed a five-year contract worth $12 million for the first two years, $7.5 million of which guaranteed, and the last three years voidable by the Washington Redskins on March 13, 2012. By the start of the 2012 season, he was named the second starting wide receiver opposite of Pierre Garçon after competing with Leonard Hankerson for the starting flanker position. In Week 2 against the St. Louis Rams, he was penalized for unsportsmanlike conduct during the Redskins' two-minute drive attempt in the fourth quarter to tie with or beat the Rams. After catching a pass on a third down and being tackled by Cortland Finnegan, Finnegan shoved Morgan while he was getting up and put his hand in Morgan's face. Morgan reacted by throwing the ball at Finnegan and the Redskins were then given a 15-yard penalty. Redskins kicker Billy Cundiff then attempted a 62-yard field goal on fourth down, missing and leaving the final score 31–28. Morgan was later fined $7,875 by the NFL for the penalty. On a play where Robert Griffin III rushed for 12 yards, the ball popped into the air as he was tackled, Morgan caught the ball and ran it 13 yards for a touchdown in the Week 13 win over the New York Giants. In the next game against the Baltimore Ravens, he scored his first receiving touchdown of the season.

==== 2013 season ====
Morgan took over as the team's kick returner in place of struggling rookie Chris Thompson. Originally named the starter at the start of the season, he lost his starting position to Hankerson. For the first time in his career, he was benched after being listed as inactive in Week 11. The following week, he returned to his starting position after Hankerson was moved to injured reserve.

=== Chicago Bears ===
On April 21, 2014, Morgan agreed to a one-year deal with the Chicago Bears after the Redskins chose not to pick up the last three years of his five-year contract.

=== New Orleans Saints ===
Morgan signed with the New Orleans Saints on May 17, 2015. He was released on September 5 for final roster cuts before the start of the season.

=== NFL statistics ===
Year	Team	Games		Receiving					Rushing					Fumbles	
Year	Team	GP	GS	Rec	Yds	Avg	Lng	TD	Att	Yds	Avg	Lng	TD	Fum	Lost
2008	SF	12	1	20	319	16.0	48T	3	0	0	0.0	0	0	0	0
2009	SF	16	15	52	527	10.1	61	3	5	61	12.2	20	0	0	0
2010	SF	16	11	44	698	15.9	65	2	2	17	8.5	13	0	2	1
2011	SF	5	5	15	220	14.7	30T	1	0	0	0.0	0	0	0	0
2012	WAS	16	15	48	510	10.6	32	2	3	25	8.3	9	0	1	0
2013	WAS	14	7	20	214	10.7	21	0	2	13	6.5	9	0	2	0
2014	CHI	14	7	10	70	7.0	13	1	2	30	15.0	21	0	0	0
Total		93	61	209	2,558	12.2	65	12	14	146	10.4	21	0	5	1

== Personal life ==
Growing up in Washington D.C., Morgan was a fan of the Washington Redskins, along with his family, during his childhood and formative years.
