= EJ Jarvis =

American former basketball player and activist

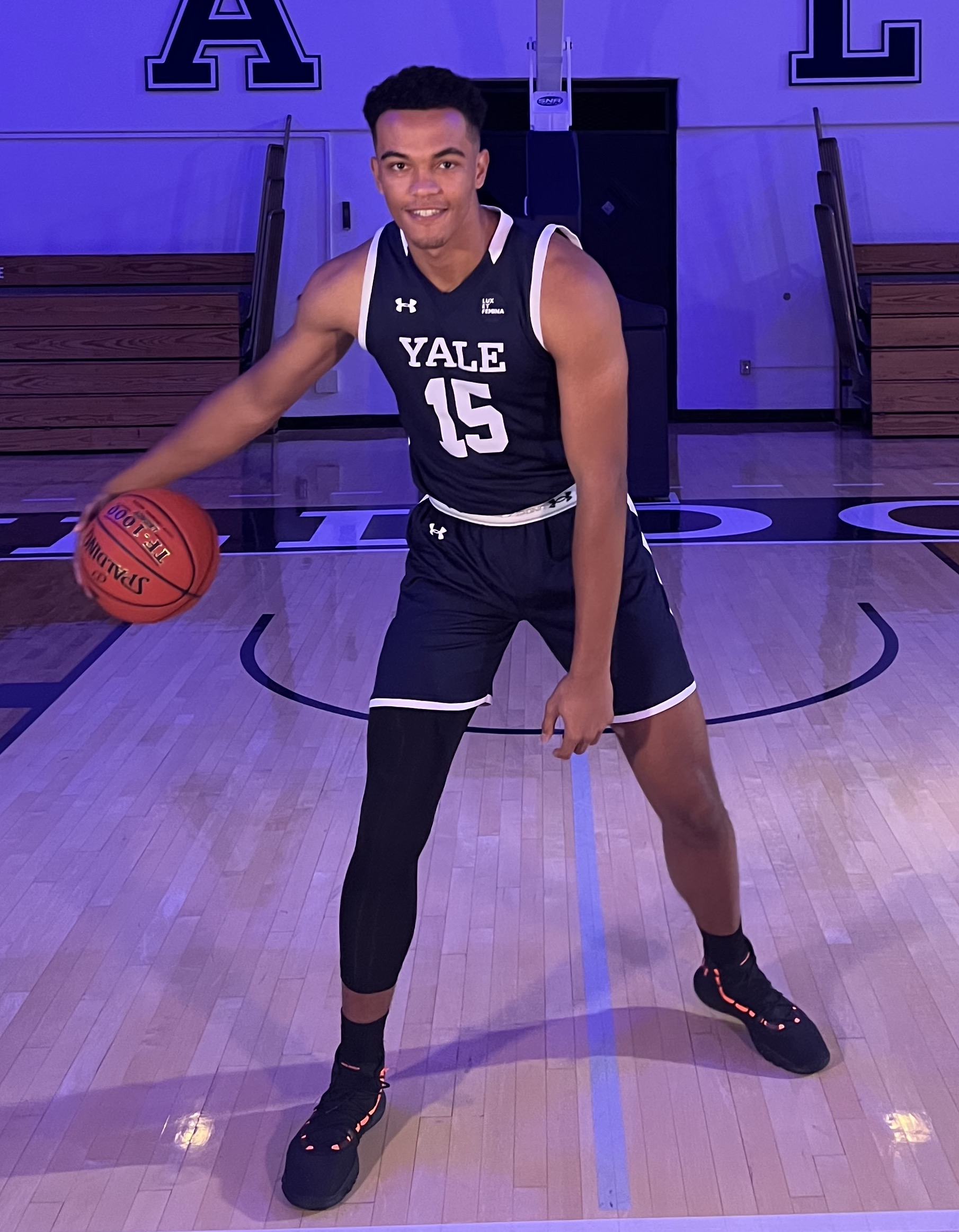
- Jarvis with Yale University in 2021

Personal information
- Born: August 7, 2000 (age 26) Washington, D.C., U.S.
- Listed height: 6 ft 8 in (2.03 m)
- Listed weight: 220 lb (100 kg)

Career information
- High school: Maret School (Washington, D.C.)
- College: Yale (2019–2023)
- Position: Power forward

Career highlights
- Second-team All-Ivy League (2023)

Ernest “EJ” Drew Jarvis II (born August 7, 2000) is an American former basketball player and activist. He is best known for his time spent playing collegiate basketball for the Yale Bulldogs, during which he won three Ivy League Championships, one in each of the three seasons he played.

== Early life and education ==
Jarvis was born August 7, 2000 to Ernie and Debbi Jarvis. He has a younger brother, Jacob. His grandmother is American neuroscientist and politician Charlene Drew Jarvis, and his great-grandfather is American surgeon and medical researcher Charles R. Drew.

Jarvis grew up in the Washington metropolitan area, in both Shepherd Park, Washington, D.C. and in the Maryland suburbs. While attending Maret School, Jarvis organized and maintained a small clothing business in the Washington, D.C. area.

He graduated from Yale University with a bachelor's degree in Urban Studies in 2023.

== High school career ==
Jarvis attended Maret School in Washington, D.C., which is coached by Chuck Driesell, son of Basketball Hall of Fame coach Lefty Driesell. Jarvis was a four-year starter and two-year team captain on the basketball team.

During his sophomore year in 2017, Jarvis won a share of the MAC Regular Season Championship and helped Maret to the District of Columbia State Athletic Association (DCSAA) title game alongside teammate Luka Garza. During his senior year, Jarvis led Washington, D.C., in points per game, rebounds per game, blocks per game and field goal percentage. At the end of his senior year, Jarvis was named to the 2018–19 All-USA District of Columbia Boys Basketball First Team, the 2019 Washington Post Winter All-Met Boys’ Basketball Second Team, and selected for the Capital Classic All-Star game in 2019.

Jarvis also lettered in track and field where he competed in high jump, shot put, and discus, and ran the 4x400. His senior year, he was awarded All-Conference honors and won a silver medal in the DCSAA state-championship for shot put.

=== AAU ===
Jarvis was a three-star recruit and played AAU basketball with Team Takeover. In 2016, he was selected to the Nike Elite 100 Camp in St. Louis. During the 2018 EYBL season, Team Takeover went 16–0 during the regular season and went on to win the 2018 Nike EYBL Championship.

== College career ==
In May 2018, Jarvis committed to play basketball for James Jones at Yale University over Virginia Tech, the University of Pennsylvania, Columbia University and George Washington University. He and teammate, August Mahoney, were the only two recruits Yale brought in for the Class of 2023.

=== Freshman Year (2019–2020) ===
While Jarvis only appeared in 10 games his freshman year, the 2019–20 Yale Bulldogs were awarded the 2020 Ivy League Regular Season Championship and a bid to March Madness when the Ivy League announced the Ivy League Tournament would be canceled due to the COVID-19 global pandemic.

=== Sophomore Year (2020–2021) ===
Amidst the shift to online classes and the looming threat of a canceled season, Yale Men’s basketball saw a significant number of returning players opt to take gap years to pursue career opportunities. However, Jarvis was not one of those players as he enrolled for his sophomore year and took classes remotely away from New Haven since sophomores were not allowed on campus for the fall semester. On November 12, 2020, the Ivy League announced it would be canceling all winter sports due to the pandemic.

=== Junior Year (2021–2022) ===
During Jarvis’ junior year with Yale basketball, he was limited to only 22 games due to several injuries and hospitalizations, one of which included a concussion suffered during his first career start against Albany. Prior to Yale’s first game against their rival Harvard since March 2020, Jarvis created a virtual flyer that included tipoff details and announced a “black out” color theme for the return of undergraduate fans for the first time since December 14, 2021 due to the SARS-CoV-2 Omicron variant. Jarvis had career highs with 9 rebounds, 3 steals, and 2 blocks, and Yale won 58–55. Five days later, Jarvis surpassed his career high in rebounds with 11, as Yale beat Harvard 62–59 for the second time that season. His first career double-double (12 points, 11 rebounds) came in a win over Penn. Yale defeated Princeton to claim the 2022 Ivy League Tournament Championship and clinch a berth to the 2022 March Madness Tournament where they faced Purdue in the first round. At the end of the season Jarvis was named as an Academic All-Ivy selection, awarded the team's Dick Derby Scholarship Award, and named to NABC Academic Honors Court. Jarvis also served as a Student-Athlete mentor for first-year student-athletes throughout his junior year.

=== Senior Year (2022–2023) ===
Jarvis appeared in all 30 games and started the final 22. He averaged 11.3 points and 5.5 rebounds. His best game came in a win on senior night against Cornell where he scored a career high 34 points and grabbed 10 rebounds. Following that performance, he was named the Ivy League Player of the Week. After beating Brown in the final regular season game, Yale was awarded the 2023 Ivy League Regular Season Champion. As a result of Yale’s lost to Princeton in the 2023 Ivy League Tournament, Yale was awarded a bid to the NIT tournament where they played Vanderbilt in the first round. At the end of the season, Jarvis was named 2nd Team All-Ivy and was the co-recipient of the team’s Dutch Arnold MVP Award. He was also named to the NABC Honors Court for a second consecutive year.

=== Graduate Year (2023–2024) ===
On March 31, 2023, Jarvis took advantage of his extra COVID-19 year of NCAA eligibility and committed to the University of Florida as a graduate transfer. He chose Florida over Georgetown University, the University of California, Berkeley, the University of Miami, Northwestern University, and others. While at Florida, Jarvis was enrolled in the University of Florida, Warrington College of Business, where he was pursuing his Master’s in Business Administration. He also was selected to attended the SEC Leadership Council Meeting held at the conferences headquarters in Birmingham, Alabama. However, on September 27, 2023, the team announced that Jarvis had taken a personal leave from the school. One week later, Jarvis announced that he was retiring from basketball to pursue other academic and career options. Jarvis went on to accept the Woodbridge Fellowship at Yale University for the 2023–2024 academic year.

== Activism ==
After the murder of George Floyd in 2020, Jarvis marched in Washington, D.C. protests. During his sophomore year, Jarvis published work on the topic of racial issues surrounding African Americans in a special magazine issue that was a collaboration between the Yale Journal of Medicine and Law, the Yale Scientific Magazine, the Yale Literary Review, and Yale Global Health Review. At Yale's 2023 Commencement, Jarvis was awarded Yale’s Roosevelt L. Thompson Prize for his public service. He also served on the 2024 Yale Martin Luther King Jr. Commemoration Planning Committee.
