= District of Columbia State Athletic Association =

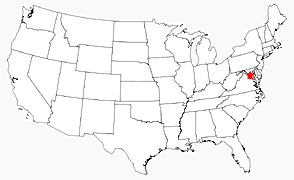
- Abbreviation: DCSAA
- Formation: 2012
- Type: Volunteer; NPO
- Legal status: Association
- Headquarters: 1050 First Street, NE; Washington, D.C. 20002
- Executive Director: Kenneth Owens
- Affiliations: National Federation of State High School Associations
- Staff: 8

The District of Columbia State Athletic Association (DCSAA), is the association that oversees post-season high school sporting contests in Washington, D.C. DCSAA is made up of public schools from the DCIAA, DC private schools from various conferences such as the WCAC and the MAC, and DC charter schools. Since the athletic talent in DC is spread out amongst various different leagues, the DCSAA aims to provide a medium for which the best schools, regardless of type, can compete under unified rules. That way, there can be a true city champion, rather than a public school champion and private school champions.

The DCSAA sponsors championships in football, basketball, soccer, cross country, cheerleading, baseball, indoor track, outdoor track, softball, golf, lacrosse, tennis, wrestling, swimming, chess, ultimate frisbee and volleyball.

== Member High Schools ==
A mix of public, parochial, charter, and independent schools are members of the DCSAA.

=== Charter schools ===
School	Colors	Team name	Established	Enrollment	Conference
Booker T. Washington Public Charter School		Warriors	1999	250	WCSAA
Capital City Public Charter School	-	Eagles	-	-	ISSAC
Cesar Chavez Public Charter School	-	Eagles	-	-	PCSAA
E.L. Haynes Public Charter School	-	Mountain Lions	-	-	PCSAA
Friendship Collegiate Academy Public Charter School		Knights	2000	1,350	PCSAA
Friendship Technology Charter School	-	Knights	-	-	PCSAA
IDEA Public Charter School	-	Timberwolves	-	-	PCSAA
KIPP College Prep	-	Panthers	-	-	PCSAA
Options Public Charter School	-	Panthers	-	-	PCSAA
Paul Public Charter School		Pirates	2000	675	PCSAA
Perry Street Pre Public Charter School	-	Pride	-	-	PCSAA
Richard Wright Public Charter School	-	Spartans	-	-	PCSAA
Thurgood Marshall Academy		Warriors	2001	400	PCSAA
Washington Latin Public Charter School		Lions	2006	600	PCSAA
Washington Math/Science Technology High School	-	Panthers	-	-	PCSAA

=== Diocesan schools ===
School	Colors	Team name	Established	Enrollment	Conference
Archbishop Carroll High School		Lions	1951	400	WCAC

=== Independent schools ===
School	Colors	Team name	Established	Enrollment	Conference
British International School of Washington		Lions	1998	425	ISSAC
Edmund Burke School		Bengals	1968	300	PVAC
The Field School		Falcons	1972	375	PVAC
Georgetown Day School		Mighty Hoppers	1945	1,050	MAC
Georgetown Visitation Preparatory School		Cubs	1799	500	ISL
Gonzaga College High School		Eagles	1821	925	WCAC
Maret School		Frogs	1911	625	MAC
Model Secondary School for the Deaf		Eagles	1969	-	MISAL
National Cathedral School		Eagles	1900	575	ISL
St. Albans School		Bulldogs	1909	575	IAC
St. Anselm's Abbey School		Panthers	1942	250	PVAC
St. John's College High School		Cadets	1851	1,100	WCAC
Sidwell Friends School		Quakers	1883	1,050	MAC ISL
Washington International School		Red Devils	1966	925	PVAC

=== Public ===
School	Colors	Team name	Established	Enrollment	Conference
Anacostia High School		Indians	1937	449	DCIAA
Ballou Senior High School		Knights	1958	930	DCIAA
Benjamin Banneker Academic High School		Bulldogs	1981	482	DCIAA
Bell Multicultural High School	-	Griffins	1989	288	DCIAA
Cardozo Senior High School		Clerks	1928	-	DCIAA
Coolidge Senior High School		Colts	1940	346	DCIAA
Dunbar High School		Crimson Tide	1870	584	DCIAA
Eastern High School		Ramblers	1890	818	DCIAA
H.D. Woodson Senior High School	-	Warriors	1972	634	DCIAA
Luke C. Moore High School	-	Eagles	-	266	DCIAA
McKinley Technology High School		Trainers	1926	619	DCIAA
Phelps High School	-	Panthers	1912	328	DCIAA
School Without Walls		Penguins	1971	585	DCIAA
Theodore Roosevelt Senior High School		Roughriders	1932	668	DCIAA
Jackson-Reed High School		Tigers	1935	2153	DCIAA

== Champions ==
=== Baseball ===
- 2013- Maret School
- 2014- St. John's College High School
- 2015- Gonzaga College High School
- 2016- St. Albans
- 2017- Gonzaga College High School
- 2018- Woodrow Wilson High School
- 2019- St. John's College High School

=== Men's Basketball ===
- 2013- Coolidge Senior High School
- 2014- Theodore Roosevelt Senior High School
- 2015- St. John's College High School
- 2016- H.D. Woodson Senior High School
- 2017- Gonzaga College High School
- 2018- Woodrow Wilson High School
- 2019- Sidwell Friends School (AA), KIPP College Prep (A)

=== Women's Basketball ===
- 2013- H.D. Woodson Senior High School
- 2014- St. John's College High School
- 2015- Georgetown Visitation Preparatory School
- 2016- St. John's College High School
- 2017- St. John's College High School
- 2018- St. John's College High School
- 2019- St. John's College High School (AA), Eastern High School (A)
- 2022- Sidwell Friends School

=== Chess ===
- 2015- St. Anselm's Abbey School
- 2016- Sidwell Friends
- 2019- St. Albans

=== Men's Cross Country ===
- 2012- Sidwell Friends
- 2013- Georgetown Day School
- 2014- Sidwell Friends
- 2015- Sidwell Friends
- 2016- Gonzaga College High School
- 2017- Gonzaga College High School
- 2018- Gonzaga College High School
- 2019- Gonzaga College High School

=== Women's Cross Country ===
- 2012- Sidwell Friends
- 2013- Georgetown Visitation Preparatory School
- 2014- Georgetown Visitation Preparatory School
- 2015- Georgetown Day School
- 2016- Georgetown Visitation Preparatory School
- 2017- St. John's College High School
- 2018- Woodrow Wilson High School
- 2019- St. John's College High School

=== Football ===
- 2012- Friendship Collegiate Academy Public Charter School
- 2013- H.D. Woodson Senior High School
- 2014- Gonzaga College High School
- 2015- Gonzaga College High School
- 2016- Friendship Collegiate Academy Public Charter School
- 2017- Ballou High School (AA), The Maret School (A)
- 2018- Friendship Collegiate Academy Public Charter School (AA)

=== Men's Indoor Track ===
- 2013- Gonzaga College High School
- 2014- Gonzaga College High School
- 2015- St. John's College High School
- 2016- Gonzaga College High School
- 2017- Gonzaga College High School
- 2018- St. John's College High School
- 2019- Gonzaga College High School

=== Women's Indoor Track ===
- 2013- Woodrow Wilson High School
- 2014- Dunbar High School
- 2015- Georgetown Visitation Preparatory School
- 2016- Woodrow Wilson High School
- 2017- Woodrow Wilson High School
- 2018- St. John's College High School
- 2019- St. John's College High School

=== Men's Outdoor Track ===
- 2013- HD Woodson Senior High School
- 2014- Georgetown Day School
- 2015- Georgetown Day School
- 2016- Georgetown Day School
- 2017- Woodrow Wilson High School
- 2018- Archbishop Carroll High School
- 2019- Sidwell Friends School

=== Women's Outdoor Track ===
- 2013- Dunbar High School
- 2014- Woodrow Wilson High School
- 2015- Dunbar High School
- 2016- Georgetown Day School
- 2017- Woodrow Wilson High School
- 2018- Dunbar High School
- 2019- St. John's College High School

=== Men's Soccer ===
- 2012- St. Albans
- 2013- Sidwell Friends
- 2014- Gonzaga College High School
- 2015- St. Albans
- 2016- Washington International School
- 2017- Gonzaga College High School
- 2018- St. John's College High School
- 2019- Gonzaga College High School

=== Women's Soccer ===
- 2012- National Cathedral School
- 2013- National Cathedral School
- 2014- National Cathedral School
- 2015- Woodrow Wilson High School
- 2016- St. John's College High School
- 2017- St. John's College High School
- 2018- Sidwell Friends School
- 2019- St. John's College High School

=== Softball ===
- 2013- National Cathedral School
- 2014- National Cathedral School
- 2015- Georgetown Visitation Preparatory School
- 2016- National Cathedral School
- 2017- National Cathedral School
- 2018- National Cathedral School
- 2019- National Cathedral School

=== Men's Tennis ===
- 2017- Maret School
- 2018- Sidwell Friends
- 2019- Sidwell Friends

=== Women's Tennis ===
- 2017- National Cathedral School
- 2018- Sidwell Friends
- 2019- Sidwell Friends

=== Volleyball ===
- 2013- St. John's College High School
- 2014- St. John's College High School
- 2015- St. John's College High School
- 2016- St. John's College High School
- 2017- St. John's College High School
- 2018- St. John's College High School
- 2019- St. John's College High School

=== Ultimate Frisbee ===
- 2015- Woodrow Wilson High School
- 2016- Woodrow Wilson High School
- 2017- Woodrow Wilson High School
- 2018- Woodrow Wilson High School
- 2019- Woodrow Wilson High School

=== Men's Swim and Dive ===
- 2022- St. Albans
