= GreenFaith =

Global interfaith environmental coalition

- Formation: 1992
- Founder: Rev. Dr. Franklin E. Vilas
- Founded at: New Jersey, United States of America
- Headquarters: New York City
- Executive Director: Rev. Fletcher Harper
- Website: greenfaith.org

GreenFaith is a global political lobby. Focusing on grassroots activism, it encourages faith leaders worldwide to invest in green energy, divest from fossil fuels, and publicly advocate for climate justice on a religious basis. It also "offers training programs, resources, and campaigns to support faith-based environmental initiatives," organizes "interfaith environmental events" and facilitates "dialogue between religious leaders, environmentalists, and policymakers".

GreenFaith has more than 100 chapters (called "Circles") in the Pacific Islands, North America, Australia, Asia, Latin America, Africa, and Europe as well as religious partners in over 40 countries. The organization "envisions a movement in which leaders can take their rightful place in the community and lead actions" near their hometowns via local organizing.

They have offices in Kenya and Germany and staff in the US, Germany, France, Kenya, Brazil, Indonesia and Japan.

== History ==
=== Foundation ===
In 1992, GreenFaith was founded as "Partners for Environmental Quality" in New Jersey by episcopal priest Rev. Dr. Franklin E. Vilas and other New Jersey Christian and Jewish faith leaders, following their attendance of the U.N. Earth Summit in Rio de Janeiro.

For the next two decades, their primary work was focusing on religious themes such as stewardship alongside "energy audits, organized financing and installation of solar arrays at religious facilities, and [advocating] for legislation to reduce air pollution and greenhouse gas emissions".

The GreenFaith Fellowship Program was launched in 2005.

=== Leadership ===
In 2002, episcopal priest Reverend Fletcher Harper joined GreenFaith and became its executive director. Harper is a Christian humanist and a 1985 graduate of Princeton University as well as the Union Theological Seminary. He first became involved in environmental projects during his elementary school years. In 2015, Harper authored GreenFaith: Mobilizing God’s People to Protect the Earth, after conducting hundreds of interviews with people of various faiths about divine experiences involving nature.

In 2021, Harper condemned COP 29's lack of addressing corporate responsibility for climate change and advised faith leaders:

"First, clergy need to name what is creating this problem ... For religious leaders, this means ... getting comfortable saying things like: 'ExxonMobil, BP, Shell, and other oil and gas companies are systematically destroying the planet – and financial giants like JPMorgan Chase, Bank of America, Wells Fargo, BlackRock, and Vanguard are bankrolling the destruction.' ... We must make it clear that these companies, their shareholders, our government, and those working for these institutions must change ... This is not a time for preachers to play it safe; it is time for prophetic thunder. The well-being of billions of people and the planet's future hang in the balance."

=== Increased activity ===
In 2005, Hurricane Katrina "marked a surge of activity" for GreenFaith, as its ensuing environmental disasters "cast a spotlight" on the effects of climate change on vulnerable communities. Following the 2006 film An Inconvenient Truth, more faith-based organizations prioritized environmental justice and stewardship in their practices, leading to increased GreenFaith collaborations.

Another surge in membership occurred in 2009, after what Biohabitats named the "spectacular failure" of the 2009 United Nations Climate Change Conference in Copenhagen. Harper explained that the negotiations' ineffectiveness inspired faith-based organizations to take a stronger stance on climate change, such as inspiring activism and divestment from fossil fuels. Harper stated this helped inspire interfaith solidarity events, such as the People's Climate March of 2014, of which GreenFaith was an organizer.

=== Activism ===
In 2015, GreenFaith organized 20,000 people worldwide to take part in a Global Climate March, the day before Paris's U.N. Climate Change Conference.

The same year, GreenFaith led the Una Terra, Una Familglia Humana (lit. 'One Earth, One Human Family') Climate Change March in Vatican City.

GreenFaith was among the organizers of the 2017 People's Climate March in Washington, D.C.

In June 2018, GreenFaith collaborated with the Oxford Centre for Hindu Studies on the Bhumi Project to mobilize Hindus against climate change.

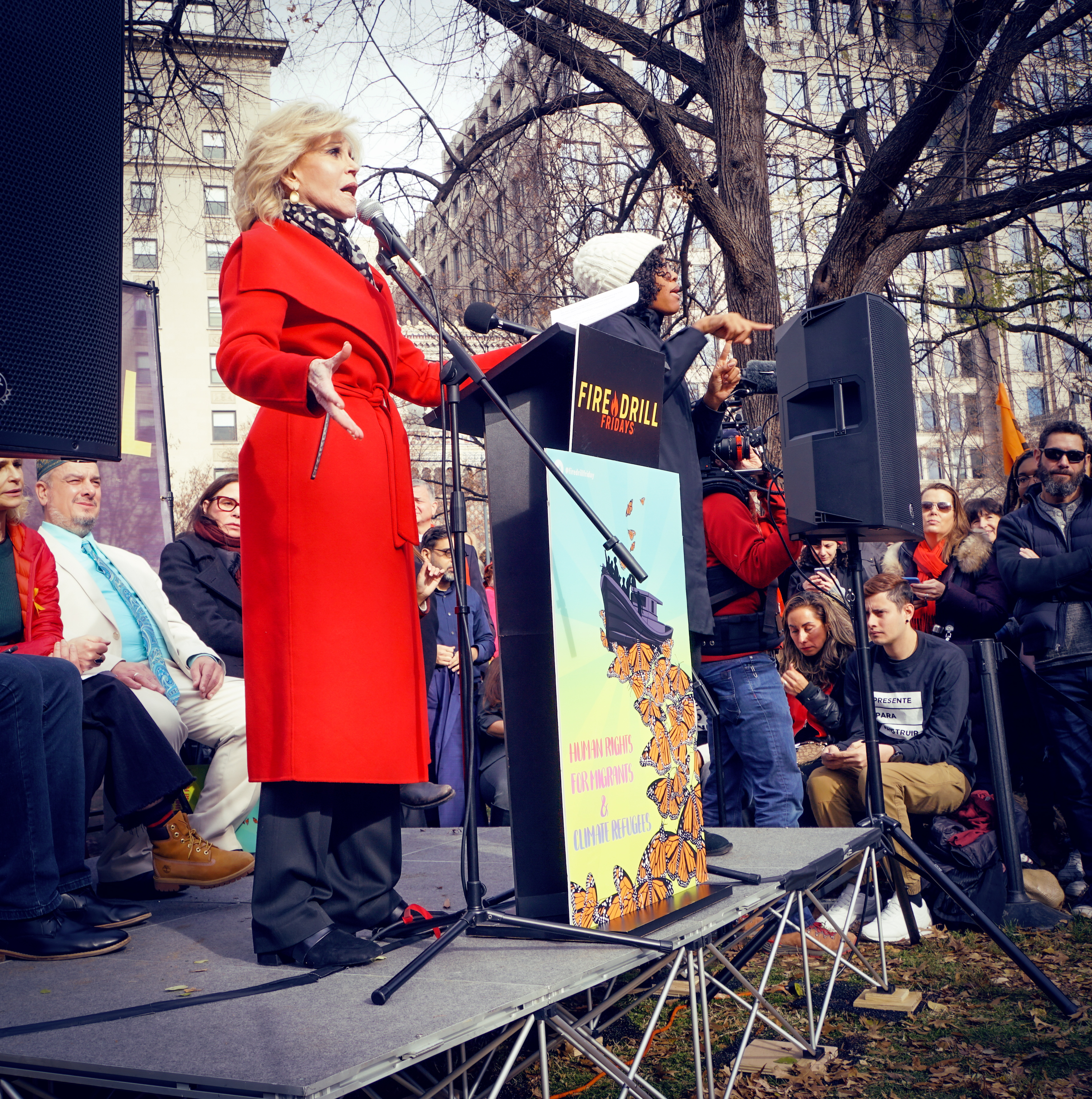
Jane Fonda speaks at Washington, D.C.'s Fire Drill Fridays protest, 2019.

On December 6, 2019, GreenFaith protested the financial institutions in Washington, D.C. that profited from fossil fuel projects and immigrant detention. American actress Jane Fonda spoke at the protest.

In October 2021, Roman Catholic association Sisters of Mercy of the Americas protested fossil fuels and the climate emergency outside Bay View Academy in Riverside, Rhode Island. The sisters cited their support of GreenFaith's Washington D.C. protests calling for green energy, commending the marches' leadership by Native American activists.

In October 2022, GreenFaith members in Charlotte, North Carolina held a peaceful protest outside of the Bank of America's headquarters, urging a Just Transition to renewable energy.

In November 2022, it organized religious leaders to call for a Fossil Fuel Non-Proliferation Treaty, representing more than 1.5 billion people worldwide, ahead of that year's United Nations Climate Change Conference in Egypt.

In December 2022, a GreenFaith roundtable in Ghana began a series of interfaith conversations to see the country's plan for a Just Transition to 100% renewable energy. The meetings resulted in the creation of a Keep It In The Ground Ghana campaign, aimed at reducing fossil fuel projects.

In September 2023, GreenFaith was among the 500 groups participating in New York City's March to End Fossil Fuels. Other backers and participants included senator Ed Markey, Michigan rep. Rashida Tlaib, New York rep. Jamaal Bowman, Tennessee rep. Justin Pearson, actress Jane Fonda, Canadian actress Naomi Klein, actor Mark Ruffalo, and environmentalist Bill McKibben. About 10,000 protestors were expected, including Goldman Environmental Prize winners Nalleli Cobo and Sharon Lavigne, UN youth adviser Ayisha Siddiqa, and climate scientist Peter Kalmus.

On November 9, 2023, GreenFaith released a report detailing the 900-mile East African Crude Oil Pipeline's disturbance of more than 2,000 gravesites across Uganda and Tanzania. EACOP constructor TotalEnergies published a public response to the report the following week, criticizing the "allegations".

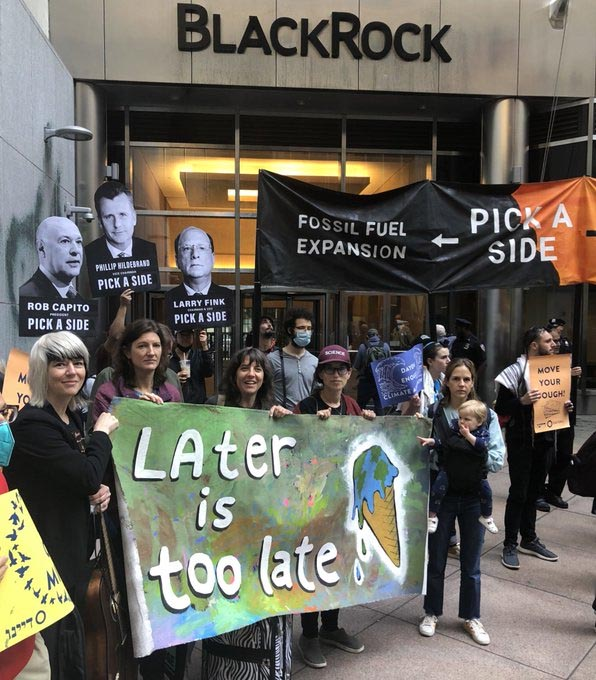
GreenFaith activists, in collaboration with Extinction Rebellion, protest BlackRock on May 31, 2022. Among those arrested on this day was director Fletcher Harper.

After the release of GreenFaith's report, 8 African faith leaders signed a letter condemning the mistreatment of graves and sacred places by TotalEnergies. In the letter they condemn the displacement of 100,000 people, the state brutality against protestors who "walk in fear of abduction", habitat destruction, water pollution, failed crops, reduced life expectancy as in Shell Oil's Niger Delta rilling, and human rights abuses.

On May 25, 2023, GreenFaith activists in Paris chained themselves to a footbridge to stop EACOP, in collaboration with Extinction Rebellion.

On January 31, 2024, GreenFaith and 350.org protestors gathered in Charlotte, North Carolina to oppose the Mountain Valley Pipeline which would carry gasoline and methane "more than 300 miles from West Virginia to Southern Virginia", as well as the pipeline's 31-mile Southgate Extension. A protestor criticized the new fossil fuel infrastructure, stating that after it is built, it is "locked in for a number of decades".

In March 2024, a GreenFaith imam and pastor collaborated to create a People's Climate Justice Budget, which details an example of "$1 billion in on-budget state spending" for environmental justice in Queens, New York. They cited the Bible's Genesis 1:2 and Matthew 22:39 which "instruct humans to care for the earth as well as our neighbors", and the Quran's Surah Al-Baqarah 2:205 and Surah Al-Kahf 18:24, which state that humans are "custodians of the planet" with "an obligation to plan for the future".

In May 2024, they collaborated with Australian Religious Response to Climate Change to mobilize ten days of climate action between May 3–12. Their demands included "calling for a rapid fossil fuel phaseout, a just transition to a clean energy future, and for polluters to pay for the damage they have caused".

During the summer of 2024, GreenFaith was among the organizers of the Summer of Heat on Wall Street campaign. On July 30, 2024, 24 faith leaders and their supporters in New York were arrested after chaining themselves to the Citibank HQ's front doors for 40 minutes. The interfaith protest included Jewish, Catholic, Quaker, Episcopalian and Methodist environmental activists.

== Complications and criticism ==
in 2015, Harper stated that it can be difficult to onboard some sects of western Christianity, because these sects may associate veneration of the environment with paganism and believe "getting too close to the environment is not a Christian thing to do". Conversely, he claims some environmental activists are "not...too happy" with organized religion. Even so, Harper emphasizes that this tension leads to "conversations and interesting opportunities".

== See also ==
- Extinction Rebellion
- 350.org
- List of environmental organizations
