= Luka Garza =

Bosnian-American basketball player (born 1998)

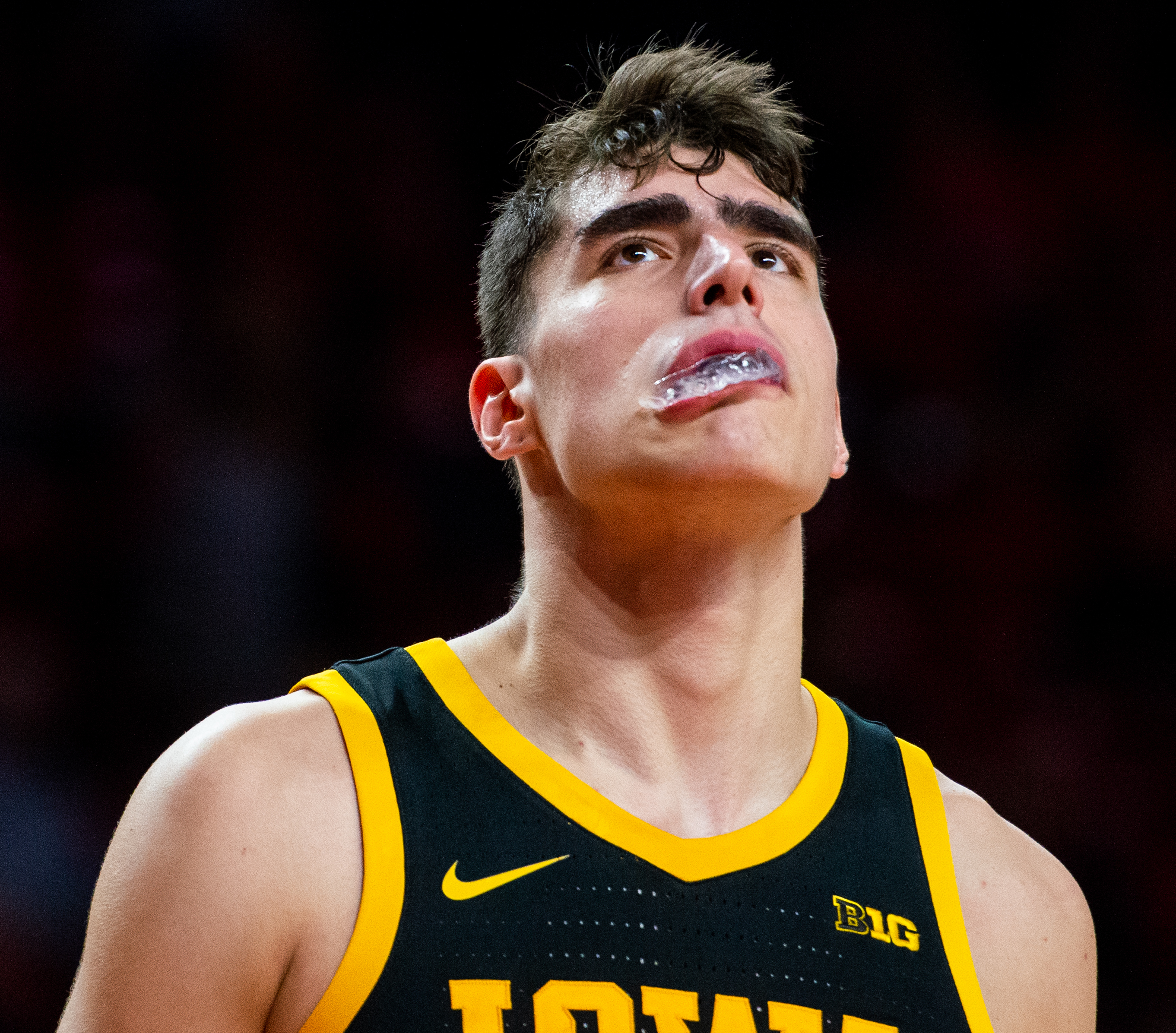
- Garza with Iowa in 2020

No. 52 – Boston Celtics
- Position: Center
- League: NBA

Personal information
- Born: December 27, 1998 (age 27) Washington, D.C., U.S.
- Listed height: 6 ft 10 in (2.08 m)
- Listed weight: 252 lb (114 kg)

Career information
- High school: Maret School (Washington, D.C.)
- College: Iowa (2017–2021)
- NBA draft: 2021: 2nd round, 52nd overall pick
- Drafted by: Detroit Pistons
- Playing career: 2021–present

Career history
- 2021–2022: Detroit Pistons
- 2021–2022: →Motor City Cruise
- 2022–2025: Minnesota Timberwolves
- 2022–2024: →Iowa Wolves
- 2025–present: Boston Celtics

Career highlights
- 2× NBA G League Next Up Game (2023, 2024); NBA G League Next Up Game MVP (2023); All-NBA G League Third Team (2022); NBA G League All-Rookie Team (2022); National college player of the year (2021); 2× Sporting News College Player of the Year (2020, 2021); 2× Consensus first-team All-American (2020, 2021); 2× Pete Newell Big Man Award (2020, 2021); 2× Kareem Abdul-Jabbar Award (2020, 2021); Lute Olson Award (2021); Senior CLASS Award (2021); 2× Big Ten Player of the Year (2020, 2021); Big Ten Male Athlete of the Year (2021); 2× First-team All-Big Ten (2020, 2021); No. 55 retired by Iowa Hawkeyes
- Stats at NBA.com
- Stats at Basketball Reference

Luka Hudson Garza (born December 27, 1998) is a Bosnian-American professional basketball player for the Boston Celtics of the National Basketball Association (NBA) and the Bosnia and Herzegovina national team.

Garza played college basketball for the Iowa Hawkeyes, where he was the consensus pick for national college player of the year for the 2020–21 season. As a junior, Garza was named a consensus first-team All-American and Big Ten Player of the Year. He played for Maret School in his hometown of Washington, D.C.

== Early life ==
Garza grew up in Reston, Virginia. He learned to play basketball from his father, Frank, who played for Idaho. Frank Garza is Spanish-American. Garza watched video tapes that his father collected of former NBA post players like Kareem Abdul-Jabbar and attempted to recreate their moves. His mother, Šejla Muftić, who is from Bosnia and Herzegovina, played professional basketball in Europe.

Garza stood 6 ft 7 in (2.01 m) as a freshman attending Maret School in Washington, D.C., but was not able to dunk a basketball until he was a sophomore. In high school, Garza was coached by Chuck Driesell, son of Basketball Hall of Fame coach Lefty Driesell. As a senior, Garza averaged 24.6 points, 11.7 rebounds and 2.5 blocks per game. He led Maret to the District of Columbia State Athletic Association (DCSAA) title game and earned D.C. Gatorade Player of the Year honors. Garza left as his school's all-time leading scorer, with 1,993 points.

Garza was a four-star recruit and chose to play college basketball for Iowa over offers from Georgetown, Georgia and Notre Dame, among others.

College recruiting
Name	Hometown	School	Height	Weight	Commit date
Luka Garza; C	Washington, D.C.	Maret School (DC)	6 ft 11 in (2.11 m)	265 lb (120 kg)	Sep 10, 2016
Luka Garza; C	Recruit ratings: Rivals: 247Sports: ESPN: (83)				
Overall recruit ranking: Rivals: 111 247Sports: 105 ESPN: 100
Note: In many cases, Scout, Rivals, 247Sports, On3, and ESPN may conflict in their listings of height and weight.; In these cases, the average was taken. ESPN grades are on a 100-point scale.; Sources: "Iowa 2017 Basketball Commitments". Rivals.; "2017 Iowa Hawkeyes Recruiting Class". ESPN.; "2017 Team Ranking". Rivals.

== College career ==
=== Freshman season (2017–2018) ===
In his college debut versus Chicago State, Garza had 16 points. He had his first double-double of 11 points and 13 rebounds the following game in a victory over Alabama State and was named Big Ten freshman of the week. As a freshman, Garza averaged 12.1 points and 6.4 rebounds per game.

=== Sophomore season (2018–2019) ===
Shortly before his sophomore season, Garza underwent surgery to remove a nine-pound (4.1 kg) cyst attached to his spleen. He also dealt with a sprained ankle in January 2019. In the NCAA Tournament, Garza had 20 points and seven rebounds to help Iowa upset Cincinnati. He averaged 13.1 points and 4.5 rebounds per game as a sophomore. Garza was named All-Big Ten honorable mention by the media.

=== Junior season (2019–2020) ===
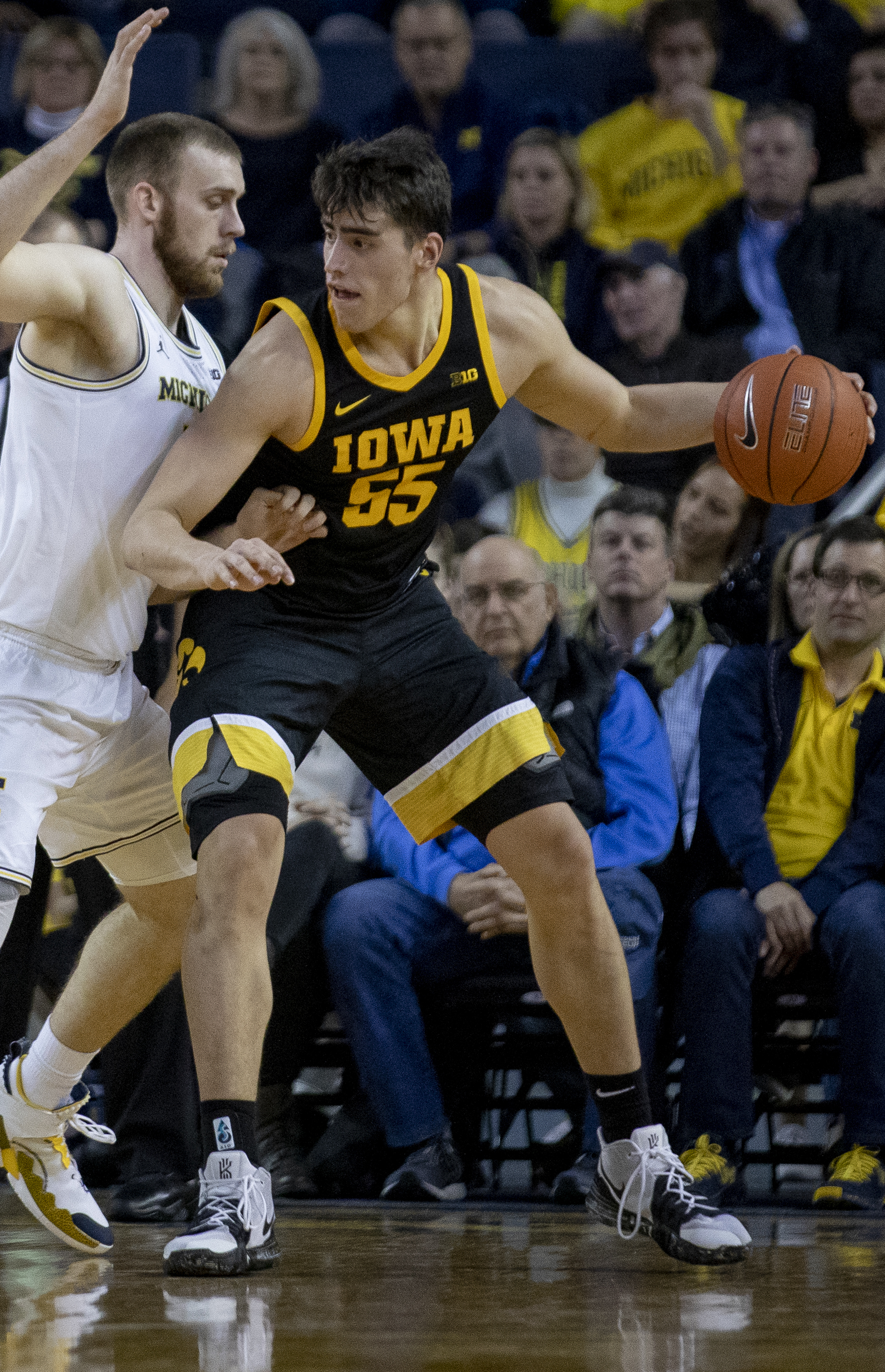
Garza (right) in 2019

Garza scored 44 points, third-most in Iowa history, in a 103–91 loss to Michigan on December 6. He followed this up with 21 points and 10 rebounds in a 72–52 victory over Minnesota and was named Oscar Robertson National Player of the Week. In an 84–68 victory over Iowa State on December 12, Garza had a tooth jarred loose after taking an elbow from teammate Joe Wieskamp. Garza returned to the game and finished with 21 points and 11 rebounds. Garza had 34 points and 12 rebounds in a 89–86 loss to Penn State on January 4, 2020. He was named to the midseason watch lists for the Wooden Award, Naismith Trophy and Oscar Robertson Trophy. On February 13, Garza tallied 38 points, eight rebounds and four blocks in an 89–77 loss to Indiana. At the end of the regular season, he was named the Big Ten Player of the Year. Garza was then named National Player of the Year by the Sporting News. He averaged 23.9 points and 9.8 rebounds per game as a junior, earning consensus first-team All-American honors. Following the season, Garza declared for the 2020 NBA draft. On August 2, he announced he was withdrawing from the draft and returning to Iowa.

=== Senior season (2020–2021) ===
On November 27, Garza scored a Carver–Hawkeye Arena-record 41 points, including 36 in the first half, on 14-of-15 shooting while posting nine rebounds and three blocks in a 103–76 victory over Southern. He joined John Johnson as the only players in program history to record two 40-point games. On December 3, Garza scored 30 first-half points as part of a 35-point, 10-rebound performance in a 99–58 victory over Western Illinois. Eight days later, he posted 34 points and six three-pointers in a 105–77 victory over Iowa State. On February 2, 2021, Garza scored his 2,000th point in a victory over Michigan State. On February 21, he recorded 23 points and 11 rebounds in a 74–68 victory over Penn State, surpassing Roy Marble to become Iowa's all-time leading scorer. After a win over the #25 Wisconsin Badgers, athletic director Gary Barta announced that they would be retiring #55 for Garza.

At the close of the season, Garza was again named Sporting News Player of the Year, becoming the first repeat winner since Michael Jordan in 1983 and 1984. He averaged 24.1 points and 8.7 rebounds as a senior, and became the first player in Iowa men's basketball history to twice be named Big Ten Player of the Year and consensus first-team All-American.

== Professional career ==
=== Detroit Pistons (2021–2022) ===
Garza was selected with the 52nd overall pick by the Detroit Pistons in the 2021 NBA draft. After a standout Summer League performance, he was signed to a two-way contract by the Pistons and their NBA G League affiliate, the Motor City Cruise. On September 24, the team announced they had converted Garza's contract from a two-way to a standard deal.

On October 23, Garza made his NBA debut, posting three points, two rebounds, two steals, and an assist across six minutes of play in a 97–82 loss to the Chicago Bulls. On November 23, Garza made his first career start, scoring seven points on 3-of-5 shooting from the field and 1-of-1 from three, in addition to three rebounds and two assists in a 100–92 loss to the Miami Heat. On December 26, Garza scored a career-high 20 points on 7-of-14 shooting from the field and 2-of-5 from three, to go along with six rebounds and two assists, before fouling out in a 144–109 blowout loss to the San Antonio Spurs. Six days later, Garza logged his first career double-double with a career-high tying 20 points and a career-high 14 rebounds across a career-high 40 minutes of action in a 117–116 win over the Spurs. Together with teammates Hamidou Diallo and Saddiq Bey, they became the first trio in league history to register 20 points and 14 rebounds in the same game in over 40 years.

On June 29, 2022, the Pistons declined their team option on Garza, making him a free agent. Garza eventually joined the Portland Trail Blazers for the 2022 NBA Summer League.

=== Minnesota Timberwolves (2022–2025) ===
On August 23, 2022, Garza signed with the Minnesota Timberwolves. On October 15, the Timberwolves converted his deal to a two-way contract. Garza was named captain of Team Luka for the G League's inaugural Next Up Game for the 2022–23 season. He was named the MVP of the game after leading his team to a 178–162 victory over Team Scoot, logging 23 points and eight rebounds.

On July 3, 2023, Garza signed another two-way contract with the Timberwolves.

On April 4, 2024, Garza's contract was converted to a standard NBA contract, dropping his two-way status and allowing him to play for the Timberwolves during the 2024 NBA playoffs. This came the day after a game against the Toronto Raptors in which Garza scored 16 points in nine minutes, his then-season high.

On July 6, 2024, Garza re-signed with the Timberwolves.

=== Boston Celtics (2025–present) ===
On July 7, 2025, Garza signed a two-year, $5.5 million contract with the Boston Celtics. On March 20, 2026, Garza had a then career-high 22 points, as well as 7 rebounds (6 offensive) in a 117-112 win against the Memphis Grizzlies. On April 12, Garza had a career-high 27 points, as well as 12 rebounds, in a 113-108 victory over the Orlando Magic.

== National team career ==
In September 2020, Garza expressed his interest to represent the Bosnia and Herzegovina national team internationally. In December 2021, Garza told a reporter that he finished the process of obtaining dual citizenship. He made his debut in August 2023 in an Olympic qualifiers game against Portugal, finishing the match with 15 points and 12 rebounds.

== Career statistics ==
Legend
GP	Games played	GS	Games started	MPG	Minutes per game
FG%	Field goal percentage	3P%	3-point field goal percentage	FT%	Free throw percentage
RPG	Rebounds per game	APG	Assists per game	SPG	Steals per game
BPG	Blocks per game	PPG	Points per game	**Bold**	Career high

=== NBA ===
==== Regular season ====
Year	Team	GP	GS	MPG	FG%	3P%	FT%	RPG	APG	SPG	BPG	PPG
2021–22	Detroit	32	5	12.2	.449	.327	.623	3.1	.6	.3	.2	5.8
2022–23	Minnesota	28	0	8.7	.543	.359	**.788**	2.3	.6	.1	.1	6.5
2023–24	Minnesota	25	0	4.9	.480	.281	.720	1.2	.2	.2	.0	4.0
2024–25	Minnesota	39	0	5.6	.495	.278	.686	1.4	.3	.2	.1	3.5
2025–26	Boston	**69**	**6**	**16.2**	**.577**	**.433**	.769	**4.1**	**1.0**	**.4**	**.4**	**8.1**
Career		193	11	10.8	.529	.367	.728	2.7	.6	.3	.2	6.0

==== Playoffs ====
Year	Team	GP	GS	MPG	FG%	3P%	FT%	RPG	APG	SPG	BPG	PPG
2024	Minnesota	**7**	0	3.7	.833	.667	**.875**	.9	.1	.0	.0	4.1
2025	Minnesota	5	0	3.6	**1.000**	**1.000**	–	.6	.0	.0	.0	2.6
2026	Boston	**7**	**1**	**8.4**	.500	.308	**.875**	**1.7**	**.9**	.0	**.1**	**4.4**
Career		19	1	5.5	.684	.412	.875	1.1	.4	.0	.1	3.8

=== College ===
Year	Team	GP	GS	MPG	FG%	3P%	FT%	RPG	APG	SPG	BPG	PPG
2017–18	Iowa	**33**	26	21.7	**.557**	.348	.681	6.4	1.1	.3	1.0	12.1
2018–19	Iowa	32	30	23.7	.531	.292	**.804**	4.5	.9	.3	.5	13.1
2019–20	Iowa	31	**31**	**32.0**	.542	.358	.651	**9.8**	1.2	**.8**	**1.8**	23.9
2020–21	Iowa	31	**31**	31.5	.553	**.440**	.709	8.7	**1.7**	.7	1.6	**24.1**
Career		127	118	27.1	.546	.367	.701	7.3	1.2	.5	1.2	18.2

== Personal life ==
Both of Garza's parents have basketball experience: his Spanish-American father, Frank Garza, played collegiately at Idaho, and his Bosniak mother, Šejla Muftić, played professionally in Europe. Garza's paternal grandfather, James Halm, played college basketball for Hawaii. His maternal uncle through marriage, Teoman Alibegović, husband of his mother's sister Lejla Muftić, was at one point the all-time leading scorer for the Slovenia national basketball team. Garza's cousins Amar Alibegović, Mirza Alibegović, and Denis Alibegović are all professional basketball players in Europe. His maternal grandfather, Refik Muftić, was an accomplished association football goalkeeper, spending most of his career with FK Sarajevo.

Since 2022, Garza has been in a relationship with Victoria Vidi.
