= Chuck Driesell =

American basketball player-coach

Current position
- Title: Head coach
- Team: Maret School
- Conference: Mid-Atlantic Athletic

Biographical details
- Born: November 3, 1962 (age 63); Charlotte, North Carolina, U.S.

Playing career
- 1981–1985: Maryland
- Position: Shooting guard

Coaching career (HC unless noted)
- 1985–1988: Naval Academy Prep
- 1989–1996: James Madison (assoc. HC)
- 1997–2003: Marymount
- 2003–2004: Georgetown (asst./RC)
- 2004–2006: Bishop Ireton HS
- 2006–2010: Maryland (asst.)
- 2010–2015: The Citadel
- 2015–present: Maret HS

Head coaching record
- Overall: 130–185
- Tournaments: 0–1 (NCAA D-III)

Charles William Driesell (born November 3, 1962) is an American basketball coach who is the boys' varsity basketball head coach at the Maret School in Washington, D.C. Formerly a college basketball coach, Driesell served as an assistant coach under Gary Williams at the University of Maryland, spent six seasons as head coach at Marymount University (1997 to 2003), and was head coach at The Citadel from 2010 to 2015. He is the son of former Maryland coach Lefty Driesell, and played for his father's team in college. Driesell was named the new boys' basketball coach at the Maret School in Washington, D.C., in the summer of 2015.

== Early life and college ==
Driesell was born in Charlotte, North Carolina, the son of Davidson College basketball coach Charles Grice "Lefty" Driesell. As a child, Chuck was a water boy and ball boy while his father served as the long-time head basketball coach at the University of Maryland. Lefty Driesell coached there from 1969 to 1986 and invented the "Midnight Madness" rally.

Chuck attended the University of Maryland, and played on the basketball team coached by his father as a shooting guard from 1981 to 1985. Driesell participated in four postseason tournaments (one NIT and three NCAA) and was also a member of the 1984 Atlantic Coast Conference (ACC) championship team. Driesell received Academic All-American honors and made the ACC Honor Roll three years. He graduated in 1985 with a bachelor's degree in business marketing.

== Coaching career ==
After college, Driesell served three years in the United States Navy and attained the rank of lieutenant. He coached the Naval Academy Preparatory School (NAPS) from 1985 to 1988 and compiled a 40–29 record. In 1989, he joined his father, Lefty, as the associate head coach at James Madison. He coached there until 1994, and during that time, the Dukes won five consecutive outright or shared Colonial Athletic Association (CAA) regular-season championships, which was an NCAA record at the time. James Madison participated in the 1994 NCAA tournament, where they were eliminated in the first round by third-seeded Florida, an eventual semifinalist team.

From 1997 to 2003, Driesell was the head coach at Marymount University, a Division III school in Arlington, Virginia. In 1999, he also assumed the role of assistant athletic director. During his six-year tenure as head coach, the Saints compiled an 88–72 record, and secured the 2000 Capital Athletic Conference tournament championship and the team's first-ever bid to the NCAA Division III tournament. During the 2003–04 season, he worked at Georgetown as the Hoyas' recruiting coordinator and an assistant coach. From 2004 to 2006, he was the head coach of the Bishop Ireton High School basketball team.

In 2006, Driesell was hired by Gary Williams as an assistant coach at the University of Maryland, the alma mater of both men. Williams said Driesell was hired strictly on his merits, and said, "Chuck was hired based on what he was as a basketball coach. Naturally, genes don't hurt, but I wouldn't hire someone just because he is someone's son if I didn't think he was a very good basketball coach." Driesell replaced Rob Moxley who left for a position at the UNC Charlotte. Driesell served as Maryland's lead recruiting coordinator and was the assistant coach responsible for "advance scouting, player development, and game preparation."

On April 28, 2010, Driesell was hired as head coach of The Citadel. He replaced Ed Conroy, who had left for Tulane. Since being at The Citadel, Driesell has won only 27.1 percent of his games. With four players returning who had started since their freshman years, Driesell only won ten games, the lowest number of wins for those players since they were freshman. On March 10, 2015, The Citadel announced that it would not renew Drisell's contract.

On April 22, 2015, San Jose State head coach Dave Wojcik added Driesell to his staff as an assistant coach. Wojcik had been an assistant coach at James Madison under Lefty Driesell. However, on June 5 Driesell was named as head coach of the Maret School in Washington, D.C.

In his second year at Maret, he led the team to a MAC (Mid-Atlantic Athletic Conference) Co-Championship, as well as the DCSAA (District of Columbia State Athletic Association) finals, where they lost to Gonzaga College High School 77–66.

== Head coaching record ==
Record table
Season	Team	Overall	Conference	Standing	Postseason
Marymount Saints (Capital Athletic Conference) (1997–2003)
1997–98	Marymount	13–13	9–5	3rd	
1998–99	Marymount	14–11	8–6	3rd	
1999–00	Marymount	16–12	9–5	3rd	NCAA D-III first round
2000–01	Marymount	12–15	6–8	T–5th	
2001–02	Marymount	19–9	10–4	3rd	
2002–03	Marymount	14–12	8–6	4th	
Marymount:		88–72	50–34		
The Citadel Bulldogs (Southern Conference) (2010–2015)
2010–11	The Citadel	10–22	6–12	5th (South)	
2011–12	The Citadel	6–24	3–15	6th (South)	
2012–13	The Citadel	8–22	5–13	5th (South)	
2013–14	The Citadel	7–26	2–14	11th	
2014–15	The Citadel	11–19	6–12	T–7th	
The Citadel:		42–113	22–66		
Total:		130–185			
National champion Postseason invitational champion Conference regular season champion Conference regular season and conference tournament champion Division regular season champion Division regular season and conference tournament champion Conference tournament champion
