= Flint Hill School =

Private school in Oakton, Virginia, US

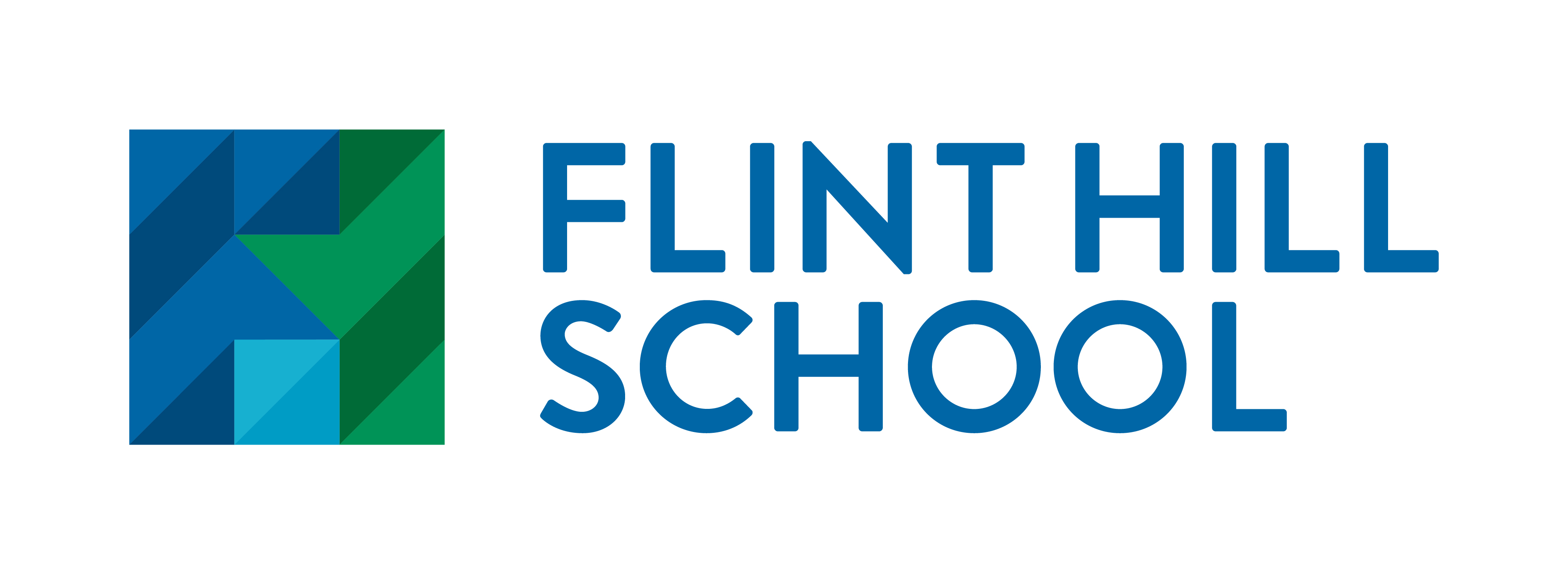

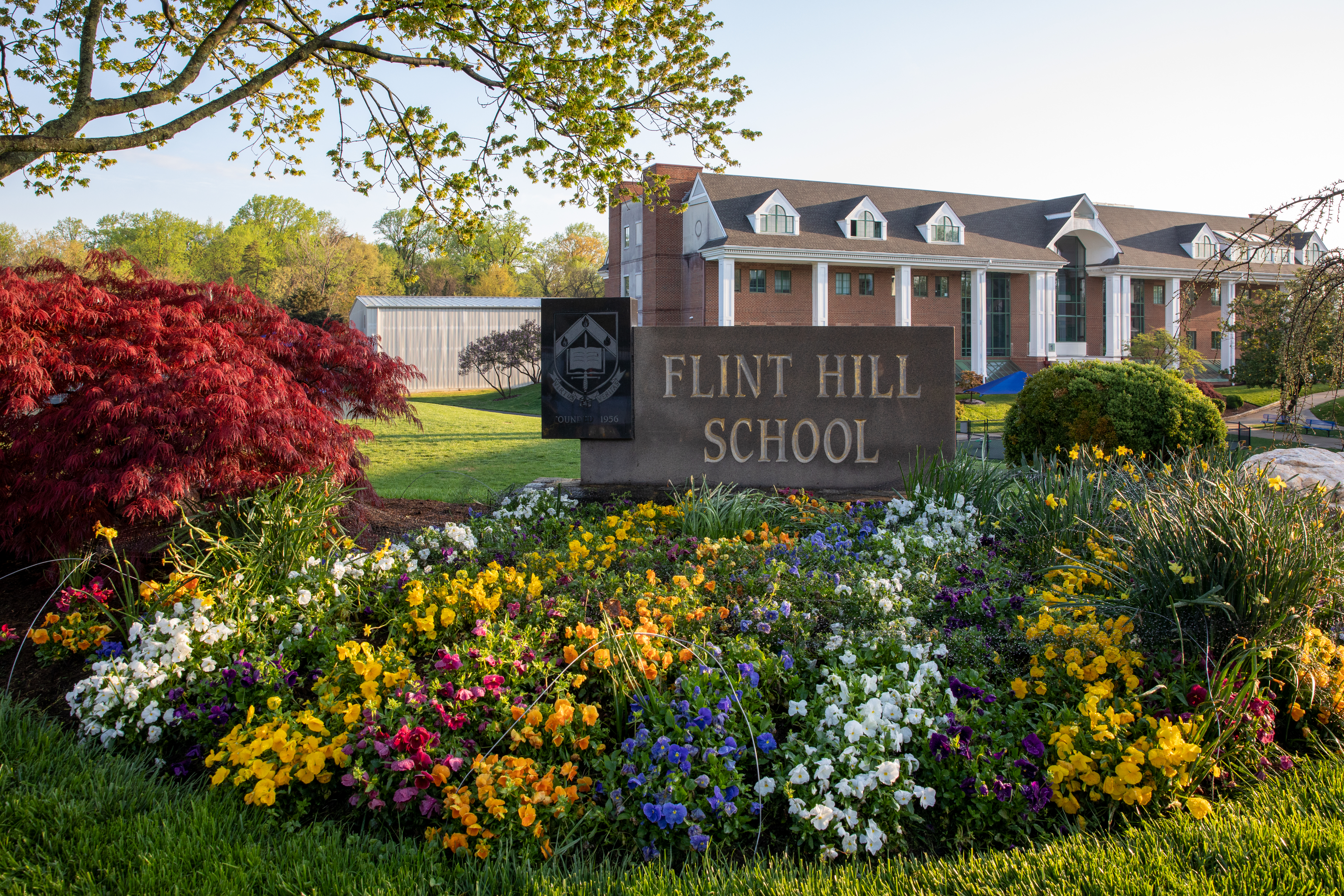
- Flint Hill School, Lower School Campus

Location
- 3320 Jermantown Rd (Upper School campus); 10900 Oakton Road (Middle School campus); 10409 Academic Drive (Lower School campus); Oakton, Virginia 22124; United States; 38°52′12″N 77°19′10″W (Upper School campus) 38°52′44″N 77°18′24″W (Lower School campus)

Information
- Type: Private, day, college preparatory
- Religious affiliation: Nonsectarian
- Established: 1956
- Founder: Don Niklason
- Chairman: Pia Trigiani
- Head of school: Patrick McHonett
- Faculty: 250
- Grades: JK–12
- Gender: Co-educational
- Enrollment: 1,045 (2024)
- Campus type: Suburban
- Colors: Blue and Green
- Athletics conference: MAC, ISL
- Mascot: Husky
- Nickname: Huskies
- Accreditation: VAIS
- Newspaper: The Flint Hill View
- Yearbook: Iditarod
- Tuition: Lower school: $43,120; Middle school: $50,815; Upper school: $54,775
- Website: https://www.flinthill.org

Flint Hill School, founded in 1956, is a private, co-educational, college preparatory school, in Oakton, Virginia, serving grades JK–12. The school has separate upper and lower school campuses about a mile apart in Fairfax County, approximately 20 miles (32 km) from Washington, D.C.

In 2025, Niche ranked Flint Hill School 9 out of 2,489 private schools in the United States, making it the best in Virginia.

== History ==
=== 20th century ===
Flint Hill School was founded in 1956, as a segregation academy, by Don Niklason as the Flint Hill Preparatory School, a co-educational day school with 18 students in grades K–8.

The school's origins date back to the state of Virginia's resistance to the Supreme Court of the United States' 1954 Brown v. Board of Education decision holding that racial segregation in public schools is unconstitutional. In 1956, the year of the school's founding, Virginia Senator Harry F. Byrd, Sr. declared a policy of Massive Resistance against compliance with Brown v. Board of Education, and the Virginia Assembly enacted the Stanley Plan, a package of thirteen statutes designed to ensure Virginia's public schools remained segregated.

In 1959, the Fairfax County School Board approved tuition grants for 60 students to attend private schools and thereby avoid desegregated public schools. Of those initial grants, 44 went to students attending the Flint Hill School. Fairfax County Public School Assistant Superintendent George Pope remarked to the Washington Post, "We've just about put that school in business."

In 2024, Head of School Patrick McHonett reflected on the school's past, saying, "Acknowledging that part of our history is essential to validating the impact it has had on our students, past and present. ... We need to own where we've been in order to recognize how far we've come, as well as chart a pathway forward." An annual event formerly called "Founder's Day" was renamed "Flint Hill Day" to celebrate the school's present and future.

Originally, students attended classes in the Miller House, an estate home belonging to the Francis Pickens Miller family. In 1986, Flint Hill purchased 13 acres (5.3 ha) of property several blocks away at the corner of Chain Bridge and Jermantown Road, and the Miller House was transported to the new campus, where it now serves as an administrative building.

In 1990, the new academic building was only partially finished and funding for its completion was in doubt. A group of educational and civic leaders from Northern Virginia led by John T. Hazel, Jr., then acquired the school and reorganized it as a nonprofit independent day school.

The 1990–91 academic year began on the new campus with 65 faculty members and an enrollment of 425 students, in grades K–12. By the late 1990s, with more than 700 students, there was a need to expand. In 1998, Flint Hill acquired parcels of property totaling 30 acres (12 ha) within one mile of the existing campus. Groundbreaking took place for the Upper School Campus in summer 2000 and classes began there in September 2001.

=== 21st century ===
In 2010, Flint Hill introduced the 1:1 technology program, providing all students with Apple Inc. computers and tablets. In 2011, it was named an "Apple Virginia Site School". In 2013 and 2015, it was recognized as an "Apple Distinguished School", an award Apple gives to schools that "demonstrate Apple's vision for learning with technology".

In 2019, Flint Hill began fundraising for a middle school facility designed to educate 7th and 8th grade students. The new Peterson Middle School opened for the 2020-2021 school year.

In June 2022, Headmaster John Thomas retired after 17 years of service to the school. Patrick McHonett succeeded Thomas as Head of School for the 2022-2023 school year.

As of 2022, Flint Hill has three campuses with more than 1,000 students and 237 teachers.

== Extracurricular activities ==
The Upper School has three continually published, on-campus student publications: The Flint Hill View (news, arts, sports, opinion, and editorial newspaper), The Rough Draft (literary and arts magazine), and The Iditarod (yearbook, formerly entitled The Talon). Both middle and upper school students can take part in class government through the Student Council Association.

=== Athletics ===
The school participates in the Independent School League (ISL) for girls' sports and the Mid-Atlantic Athletic Conference (MAC) for boys' sports. There are 22 different sports, with 32 middle school and 35 upper school teams.

Between 2007 and 2017 Flint Hill produced 165 college athletes with 83 of them going division 1.

Flint Hill's volleyball team has been ranked No. 1 in the country three times and went on a span of 44 wins before losing a match.

The Flint Hill basketball team was ranked No. 1 in the country by USA Today in 1987 in former NBA player Dennis Scott's senior season.

==== Championships ====
Boys' basketball:

- USA TODAY National Champions: 1986
- VISAA Division I State Champions: 1995
- VISAA Division I State Semi-finalist: 2005
- MAC Champions: 1995, 1997, 2004, 2005, 2006, 2009, 2010, 2011, 2019
- MAC Tournament Champions: 2008, 2009, 2010
- FH Tip-Off Tournament Champions: 2004, 2007, 2011, 2013

Football:

- VISAA Division I State Champions: 2017, 2018
- VISAA Division I State Finalist: 2008
- VISAA Division I State Semi-finalist: 2006, 2007, 2011, 2013, 2015, 2016
- MAC Champions: 2006, 2007, 2008, 2009, 2012, 2013, 2015, 2017, 2018, 2019

Boys' lacrosse:

- VISAA Division II State Semi-finalist: 2007
- VISAA Division I State Semi-finalist: 2009
- MAC Champions: 2007, 2008, 2009, 2009, 2010
- MAC Tournament Champions: 2008, 2010, 2014

Ice hockey:

- Dominion Cup Champions: 2011, 2012, 2013, 2015

Boys' soccer:

- VISAA Division I State Semi-finalist: 2005, 2006, 2007
- VISAA Division I State Finalist: 2014
- MAC Champions: 1994, 2007, 2015, 2016
- MAC Tournament Champions: 2014, 2015, 2016

Boys' tennis:

- VISAA Division I State Champions: 2006, 2007, 2008
- MAC Champions: 2006, 2008
- MAC Tournament Champions: 2006, 2008

Golf:

- MAC Champions: 1997, 2004, 2005, 2006, 2011, 2012, 2013, 2014, 2016

Baseball:

- MAC Champions: 2005, 2006, 2008, 2009, 2010, 2011, 2013, 2014, 2015, 2016
- MAC Tournament Champions: 2008, 2009, 2010, 2011, 2014
- VISAA Division I State Semi-finalist: 2013, 2014, 2016

Volleyball:

- VISAA Division I State Champions: 2008, 2009, 2010, 2012, 2013, 2014, 2015, 2017, 2018, 2019, 2021, 2022
- VISAA Division I State Finalist: 2016
- VISAA State Semi-finalist: 2005
- ISL "A" Champions: 2005
- ISL "AA" Champions: 2008, 2009, 2010, 2012, 2013, 2014, 2015, 2016, 2017, 2018, 2019, 2021, 2022
- ISL "AA" Tournament Champions: 2008, 2009, 2010, 2012, 2013, 2014, 2015, 2016, 2017, 2018, 2019, 2021, 2022
- DC Metro City Champions: 2009, 2010, 2012, 2013, 2014, 2015, 2016, 2017, 2018, 2019
- FH Invitational Tournament Champions: 2005, 2007, 2008, 2010, 2012, 2014, 2016, 2018, 2019, 2022
- Washington Post No. 1 Ranking: 2009, 2010, 2014, 2017, 2018, 2019, 2021, 2022
- Garden State Challenge Tournament Champions: 2017
- Garden State Challenge Tournament Runner-ups: 2019

==== Rivalry with The Potomac School ====
Flint Hill has a sports rivalry with The Potomac School in McLean, Virginia, dating to 1992 when both schools played at George Mason University for the first time and Flint Hill defeated Potomac in an overtime basketball victory.

== Notable alumni ==
- John R. Allen, Commander, International Security Assistance Force United States Forces, Afghanistan
- Chloe Angelides, singer, songwriter
- Justin Bonomo, professional poker player.
- Randolph Childress, former NBA player
- John Cochran, Survivor winner (TV show)
- Tommy Doyle, MLB baseball pitcher
- Justice Ellison, college football running back
- Khalil Lee, Professional Baseball Player
- Jared Leto, actor on the film Morbius and frontman of 30 Seconds to Mars, dropped out
- George Lynch, former NBA player
- Zain Naghmi, professional Super Smash Bros. Melee player
- Trey Rucker, college football safety
- Dennis Scott, former NBA player
- John Stertzer, Major League Soccer player
- Ronny Thompson, Emmy Award-winning broadcaster
- Lorena Castillo de Varela, First Lady of Panama 2014 – 2019
- Qudus Wahab (born 2000), basketball player for Maccabi Ashdod of the Israeli Basketball Premier League
