= Matthew Kaminski (journalist) =

Polish-born American journalist and editor (born 1971)

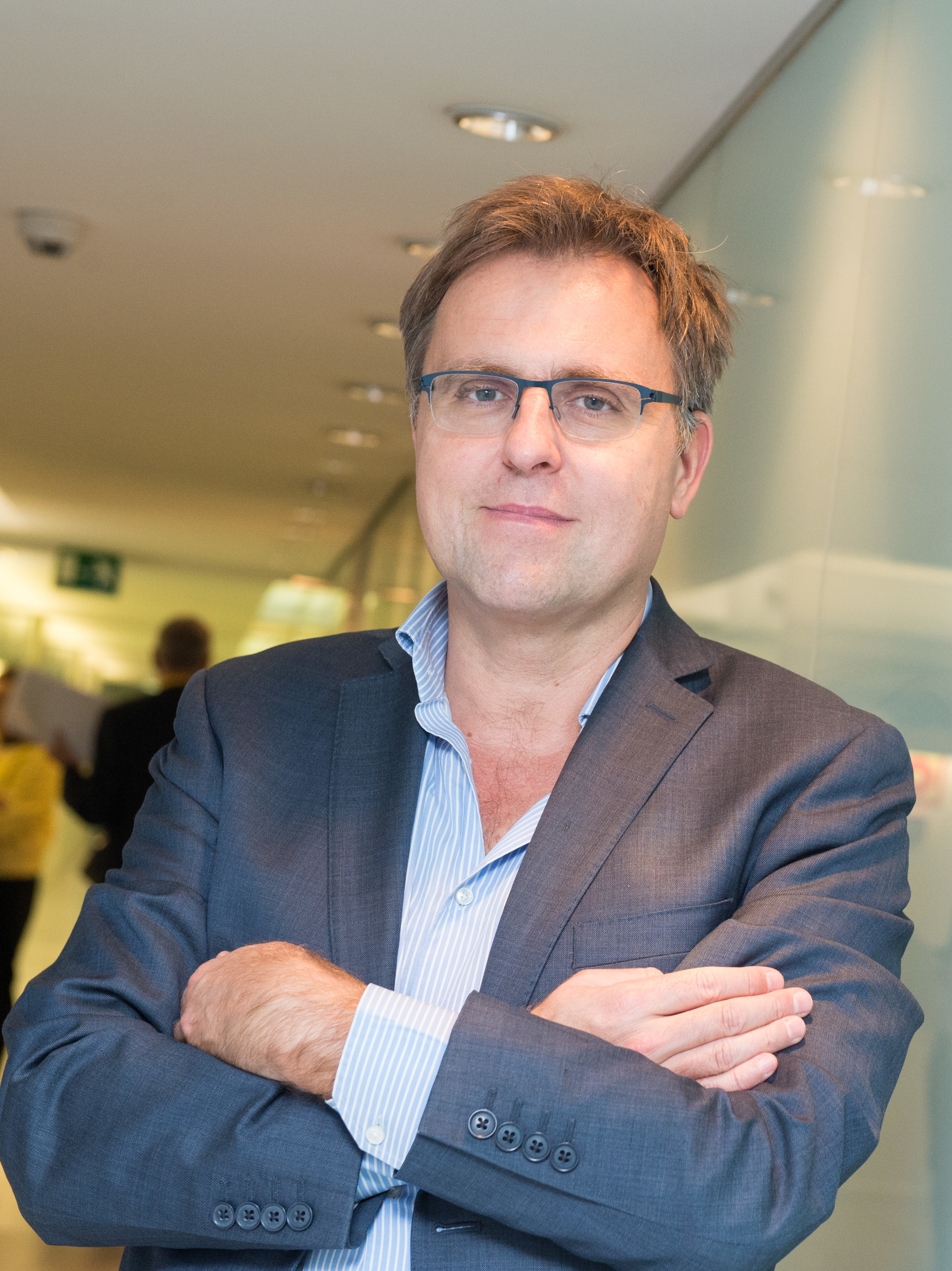
- Kaminski in 2017
- Born: November 11, 1971 (age 54); Warsaw, Poland
- Education: Yale University (BA); Universite Libre de Bruxelles (MA)
- Occupations: Journalist, editor
- Employer: POLITICO

Matthew Kaminski is a Polish-born American editor, journalist and media executive. He’s the founding Editor in Chief of POLITICO Europe and former Editor in Chief of POLITICO, where he worked from 2014-2024. He’s currently Editorial Chair of the Middle East Broadcasting Networks, Editor at Large at The Arsenal, a new startup publication focused on defense tech, and a Senior Advisor at Evident AI.

He was previously a foreign correspondent, opinion writer, and editor at The Wall Street Journal.

== Early life and education ==
Kaminski was born in Warsaw, Poland, on November 11, 1971. His father Bartlomiej Kaminski is an economist and retired professor. His mother, Ewa Kaminski, was a Polish radio journalist. He is the grandson of Włodzimierz Sokorski, a prominent post-war Polish Communist politician and writer.

After moving to the U.S. in 1980 with his family, Kaminski was raised in Washington D.C., graduating from Georgetown Day School. He received an undergraduate degree in history from Yale University, and a masters in international politics from the Universite Libre de Bruxelles's Centre Européen de Recherches Internationales & Stratgégiques (CERIS).

== Career ==
Before graduating from college, Kaminski started to report for the Financial Times and Economist on the former Soviet Union in 1993. He was the FT’s Kyiv Correspondent in 1994-97. His reporting for the FT on Yulia Tymoshenko was cited in the trial of former Ukrainian Prime Minister Pavlo Lazarenko on corruption charges in the U.S.

=== The Wall Street Journal ===
Kaminski joined the Wall Street Journal in Brussels in 1997, reporting on Central and Eastern Europe and later the European Union and NATO. He moved over to the Journal's editorial page staff in 2002, going on to become the Editorial Page Editor of its European edition, based in Paris. His columns on the European Union won the Peter Weitz Prize in 2004, awarded by the German Marshall Fund, which said they showed "extraordinary talent in covering the complexities of a unifying Europe in search of an identity."

Moving to New York in 2008, Kaminski served on the Journal’'s Editorial Board, focusing on foreign affairs, longform writing and interviews, and the military. His reporting on the Ukrainian crisis in 2014 was recognized with an Overseas Press Club Award. He was also a Finalist for the Pulitzer Prize in Commentary in 2015 for work that documented Russia’s attack on Ukraine in February 2014 and advocated for a more robust Western response.

=== POLITICO Europe ===
Kaminski was the founding editor of POLITICO Europe, which was formed in 2014 through a joint-venture between Germany’s Axel Springer and POLITICO LLC in Washington. Two years after its launch, POLITICO Europe was named the "most influential" publication on European affairs in the annual BCW poll and has kept that distinction since.

=== POLITICO ===
Moving to become Editor-in-Chief of Politico in Washington in early 2019, Kaminski led the publication through two American election cycles, the COVID-19 pandemic, and its sale to Axel Springer in late 2021. During his time at the helm, Politico broke the story that the U.S. had secretly frozen military aid to Ukraine, which lead to the first impeachment of President Donald Trump over alleged efforts to pressure the Ukrainians to investigate Joe Biden and his family. In 2022, Politico published a draft opinion of the Supreme Court ruling to overturn Roe v. Wade, which was subsequently confirmed as accurate by Chief Justice John Roberts. The story created a political firestorm, and was called the "scoop of the century." His tenure was also marked by some newsroom unhappiness over the decision to publish Ben Shapiro as a guest Playbook author in early 2021, which he defended and refused to apologize for. In his time, Politico won four George Polk Awards for its coverage of the COVID-19 pandemic, the Supreme Court and environmental reporting. Its reporting on the Supreme Court in 2022 was a Pulitzer finalist.

In July 2023, Politico announced Kaminski would move on from the top editor’s job to concentrate on writing and other activities. He is the publication's Editor-at-Large, writing on global affairs. His writing focuses on American and European politics, national security and geopolitics. He also serves on the executive advisory board of Zurich-based World.Minds, a peer-to-peer events company majority owned by Axel Springer. He is an executive director on the board of the Partners Group in Asia. He works with the AI startup Evident.

== Personal life ==
He is married to Alexandra Geneste, a French writer and journalist, and lives in Washington. He has two children.
