= Independent School League (Washington, D.C. area) =

Athletic league of Washington, D.C.-area preparatory schools

The Independent School League or ISL is a prep school athletic conference located in the Washington, D.C. metropolitan area of the United States. It was founded in 1985. Although the ISL sponsors only girls' sports, not all fifteen ISL schools are "all-girls" schools.

The ISL sponsors ten sports: basketball, cross country, field hockey, lacrosse, soccer, softball, swimming & diving, tennis, track & field, and volleyball. Most of these competitions are divided into two divisions, with yearly promotion and relegation between the two divisions.

== Member schools ==
School	Location	Colors	Team name	Established	High School Enrollment (Girls)	Student Body	Source
Bullis School	Potomac, Maryland		Bulldogs	1930	249	Co-ed	
Connelly School of the Holy Child	Potomac, Maryland		Tigers	1961	267	Girls	
Episcopal High School	Alexandria, Virginia		Maroon	1839	231	Co-ed	
Flint Hill School	Oakton, Virginia		Huskies	1956	270	Co-ed	
Georgetown Day School	Washington, D.C.		Mighty Hoppers	1945	261	Co-ed	
Georgetown Visitation Preparatory School	Washington, D.C.		Cubs	1799	490	Girls	
Holton-Arms School	Bethesda, Maryland		Panthers	1901	345	Girls	
Madeira School	McLean, Virginia		Snails	1906	320	Girls	
Maret School	Washington, D.C.		Frogs	1911	157	Co-ed	
National Cathedral School	Washington, D.C.		Eagles	1900	300	Girls	
The Potomac School	McLean, Virginia		Panthers	1904	240	Co-ed	
Sidwell Friends School	Washington, D.C.		Quakers	1883	263	Co-ed	
St. Andrew's Episcopal School	Potomac, Maryland		Lions	1978	170	Co-ed	
St. Stephen's & St. Agnes School	Alexandria, Virginia		Saints	1924	233	Co-ed	
Stone Ridge School of the Sacred Heart	Bethesda, Maryland		Gators	1923	379	girls	
