= Paul Public Charter School =

Coordinates: 38°57′40.8″N 77°1′29.4″W

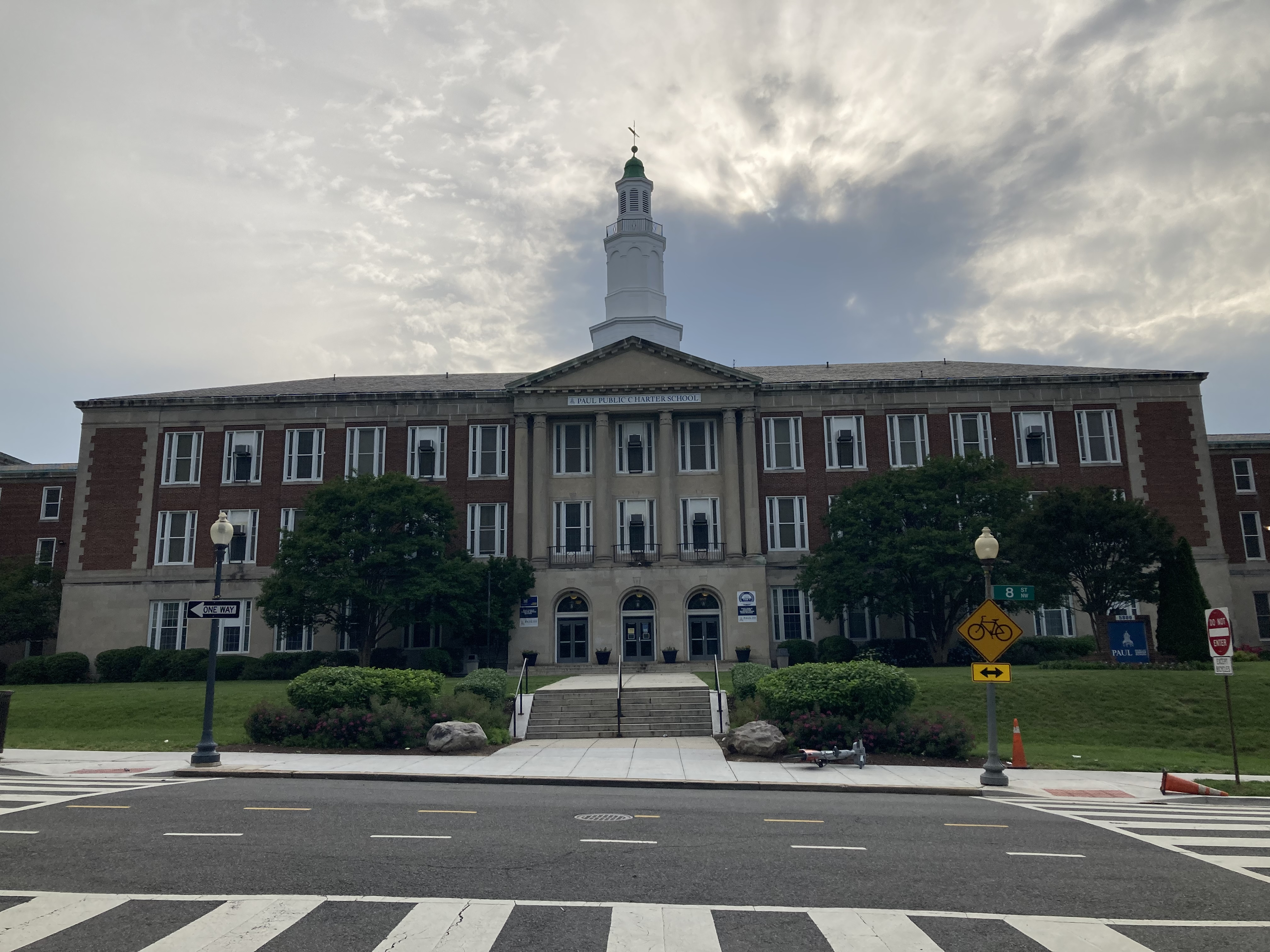
- 5800 8th Street NW; Washington, DC 20011; United States

Information
- Type: Charter school
- Established: 2000
- Head of school: Shendrina Walker
- Faculty: 138
- Grades: 5-12
- Enrollment: 747
- Average class size: 25
- Colors: Blue and Yellow and White
- Athletics conference: PCSAA and DCSAA
- Mascot: Pirate
- Website: www.paulcharter.org

Paul Public Charter School is a charter school in northwest Washington, D.C., serving students from fifth to twelfth grade.

== History ==
Paul PCS is named for Edward A. Paul, the first principal of Washington High School from 1877 to 1888. Paul was born in Haverhill in 1855 and graduated from high school in Lawrence before graduating from Dartmouth College in 1876. He moved immediately to Washington, D.C., to become a schoolteacher and, after a year, took over the Advanced Grammar School for Boys in Columbia Heights as its only teacher and principal. The experimental school was chosen instead of a high school as some objected to the establishment of a high school. Later, the Advanced Grammar School for Boys and a similar one for girls were combined to create Washington High School (the current Cardozo Education Campus). In 1885, he briefly served as acting superintendent of DC schools. In 1888, he died in a traffic collision when his bicycle was run down from behind by a horse-drawn carriage.

The school opened its doors as a public charter junior high school in 2000 through the vision and efforts of its administrator, Cecile Middleton. The first and only DCPS public school in Washington, D.C. to convert to a charter, it was originally founded in 1930. The first high school class graduated in 2016.

In 2015, a renovation and expansion of the school building was completed.
