= Mid-Atlantic Athletic Conference =

The Mid-Atlantic Athletic Conference (MAC) is an American high school athletic league composed of private schools in the Washington, D.C. area. The conference was founded in 1994. Solely male teams participate in the conference. As every member school is co-ed, the girls for all schools except Saint James compete in the Independent School League, or ISL. The MAC is often considered less competitive than the WCAC and the IAC, but more competitive than the PVAC, the three other Washington-area private high school conferences.

== Member schools ==
School	Mascot	Location	Colors	Established	Enrollment	Joined
Flint Hill School	Huskies	Oakton, Virginia		1956	1,100	1994
Georgetown Day School	Mighty Hoppers	Washington, D.C.		1945	1,075	1999
Maret School	Fighting Frogs	Washington, D.C.		1911	635	1994
The Potomac School	Panthers	McLean, Virginia		1904	1,020	1994
Sidwell Friends School	Quakers (Foxes)	Washington, D.C.		1883	1,150	1999
St. Andrew's Episcopal School	Lions	Potomac, Maryland		1978	735	1999
Saint James School	Saints	Hagerstown, Maryland		1842	235	1994

Mid-Atlantic Athletic Conference Member Schools
Location of Mid-Atlantic Athletic Conference Member School Campuses

== Traditional rivalries ==
- The Potomac School vs. Flint Hill School
- Sidwell Friends School vs. Georgetown Day High School
- St. James School vs. St. Andrew's Episcopal School
- Sidwell Friends School vs. Maret High School
- Maret High School vs. St. Andrew's Episcopal School

== Champions ==
2004-2005 Conference Champions

- Cross Country: Georgetown Day School
- Football: Sidwell Friends School
- Basketball: Flint Hill School
- Track : Georgetown Day School
- Lacrosse: The Potomac School

2004-2005 Director's Cup Winner (Overall Athletic Excellence): Sidwell Friends School

2005-2006

- Football: Sidwell Friends School / St. James School
- Wrestling: Sidwell Friends School
- Basketball: Flint Hill School
- Baseball: Sidwell Friends School
- Lacrosse: The Potomac School

2005-2006 Director's Cup Winner (Overall Athletic Excellence): Sidwell Friends School

2006-2007 Conference Champions

- Cross Country: The Potomac School
- Football: Flint Hill School
- Soccer: Sidwell Friends School
- Basketball: Sidwell Friends School
- Wrestling: Sidwell Friends School
- Lacrosse: Sidwell Friends School / Flint Hill School / St. James School
- Tennis: Flint Hill School / The Potomac School
- Baseball: Maret School / Flint Hill School
- Track: The Potomac School

2006-2007 Director's Cup Winner (Overall Athletic Excellence): Sidwell Friends School

2007-2008 Conference Champions

- Cross Country: The Potomac School
- Football: Flint Hill School
- Soccer: Flint Hill School/Sidwell Friends School
- Golf: St. Andrew's Episcopal School
- Basketball: The Potomac School / Flint Hill School
- Wrestling: Sidwell Friends School
- Baseball:Flint Hill School / Maret School
- Lacrosse: Flint Hill School
- Tennis: Flint Hill School
- Track: The Potomac School

2007-2008 Director's Cup Winner (Overall Athletic Excellence): Sidwell Friends School

2008-2009 Conference Champions

- Cross Country: Sidwell Friends School
- Football: Flint Hill School
- Soccer: Sidwell Friends School
- Golf: St. Andrew's Episcopal School
- Basketball: Flint Hill School
- Wrestling: Sidwell Friends School
- Baseball: Maret School / Flint Hill School
- Lacrosse: Flint Hill School / The Potomac School
- Tennis: The Potomac School / Sidwell Friends School/Maret School
- Track: St. Andrew's Episcopal School

2008-2009 Director's Cup Winner (Overall Athletic Excellence): Sidwell Friends School

2009-2010 Conference Champions

- Cross Country: Sidwell Friends School
- Football: Flint Hill School
- Soccer: Sidwell Friends School
- Golf: St. Andrew's Episcopal School
- Wrestling: Sidwell Friends School
- Basketball: Sidwell Friends School / Flint Hill School
- Baseball: Flint Hill School
- Lacrosse: Flint Hill School
- Tennis: The Potomac School
- Track: Maret School

2009-2010 Director's Cup Winner (Overall Athletic Excellence): Sidwell Friends School

2010-2011 Conference Champions

- Cross-Country: Georgetown Day School
- Lacrosse: The Potomac School
- Track and Field: Georgetown Day School

2010-2011 Director's Cup Winner (Overall Athletic Excellence): Flint Hill School

2011-2012 Conference Champions

- Cross Country: Georgetown Day School
- Football: The Potomac School
- Soccer: Georgetown Day School
- Golf: Flint Hill School
- Basketball: Sidwell Friends School
- Wrestling; Sidwell Friends School
- Baseball: The Potomac School / Sidwell Friends School
- Lacrosse: The Potomac School
- Tennis: The Potomac School
- Track and Field: Georgetown Day School

2011-2012 Director's Cup Winner (Overall Athletic Excellence): The Potomac School / Sidwell Friends School

2012-2013 Conference Champions

- Cross-Country: Georgetown Day School
- Lacrosse: The Potomac School
- Track and Field: Georgetown Day School

2012-2013 Director's Cup Winner (Overall Athletic Excellence): Flint Hill School

2013-2014 Conference Champions

- Cross-Country: Georgetown Day School
- Lacrosse: Flint Hill School
- Wrestling: Sidwell Friends School
- Basketball: Maret School
- Track and Field: Georgetown Day School

2013-2014 Director's Cup Winner (Overall Athletic Excellence): The Potomac School

2014-2015 Conference Champions

- Soccer: Flint Hill School
- Cross Country: Georgetown Day School
- Basketball: St. Andrew's Episcopal School and Maret School
- Wrestling: Sidwell Friends School
- Lacrosse: The Potomac School
- Track and Field: Georgetown Day School

2014-2015 Director's Cup Winner (Overall Athletic Excellence): The Potomac School

2015-2016 Conference Champions

- Cross Country: Sidwell Friends School
- Wrestling: Sidwell Friends School
- Track and Field: Sidwell Friends School

2015-2016 Director's Cup Winner (Overall Athletic Excellence): Sidwell Friends School

2017-2018 Conference Champions

- Cross Country: Sidwell Friends School
- Football:
- Golf: Maret School
- Soccer:
- Basketball:
- Wrestling:
- Baseball:
- Lacrosse:
- Tennis:
- Track and Field:

2018-2019 Conference Champions

- Cross Country: Sidwell Friends School
- Football: Flint Hill School
- Golf:
- Soccer:
- Basketball: Flint Hill School
- Swimming & Diving:
- Wrestling:
- Baseball:
- Lacrosse: St. Andrew's Episcopal School
- Tennis: Sidwell Friends School
- Track and Field: Sidwell Friends School

2021-2022 Conference Champions

- Cross Country: Georgetown Day School
- Football: St. James School
- Golf:
- Soccer:
- Basketball: Sidwell Friends School
- Swimming & Diving:
- Wrestling:
- Baseball:
- Lacrosse:
- Tennis:
- Track and Field:

2022-2023 Conference Champions

- Cross Country:
- Football:
- Golf:
- Soccer:
- Basketball: Sidwell Friends School
- Swimming & Diving:
- Wrestling:
- Baseball:
- Lacrosse:
- Tennis:
- Track and Field:
