= Trey Rucker =

American gridiron football player (born 2001)

Profile
- Position: Defensive back

Personal information
- Born: January 12, 2001 (age 25); Waldorf, Maryland, U.S.
- Listed height: 6 ft 0 in (1.83 m)
- Listed weight: 203 lb (92 kg)

Career information
- High school: Flint (Oakton, Virginia)
- College: Wake Forest (2019–2020); Oklahoma State (2021–2024)
- NFL draft: 2025: undrafted

Career history
- Washington Commanders (2025)*; Toronto Argonauts (2026)*
- * Offseason or practice squad member only
- Stats at CFL.ca

Trey Rucker (born January 12, 2001) is an American professional football defensive back. He played college football for the Wake Forest Demon Deacons and Oklahoma State Cowboys.

== Early life ==
Rucker was born in Waldorf, Maryland, on January 12, 2001, later attending Flint Hill School in Oakton, Virginia. He was rated as a three-star recruit and committed to play college football for the Wake Forest Demon Deacons.

== College career ==
=== Wake Forest ===
In two years at Wake Forest in 2020 and 2021, Rucker totaled 84 tackles with two being for a loss, a pass deflection, two interceptions and a fumble recovery. After the 2021 season, he entered his name into the NCAA transfer portal.

=== Oklahoma State ===
Rucker transferred to play for the Oklahoma State Cowboys. He played all 14 games in his first season with Oklahoma State in 2021, tallying ten tackles with one being for a loss. Rucker missed the entire 2022 regular season due to eligibility issues but returned to play in the team's bowl game versus Wisconsin, where he notched three tackles and an interception. In week 12 of the 2023 season, he recorded an interception in the Cowboys win over the Houston Cougars. In the 2023 regular season finale, Rucker notched six tackles and the game-winning forced fumble and fumble recovery in double overtime to help the Cowboys beat BYU, clinching a spot in the Big-12 Championship game. He finished the 2023 season, totaling 100 tackles with four being for a loss, a pass deflection, an interception, a forced fumble, and two fumble recoveries. In week 1 of the 2024 season, Rucker was named the Big 12 Conference defensive player of the week after notching 15 tackles, in a season-opening win over South Dakota State. In week 4, he notched 14 tackles and two interceptions in a 22–19 loss to Utah.

== Professional career ==
Pre-draft measurables
Height	Weight	Arm length	Hand span	Vertical jump	Broad jump	Bench press
5 ft 11 3/4 in (1.82 m)	203 lb (92 kg)	30 3/4 in (0.78 m)	9 1/8 in (0.23 m)	36.0 in (0.91 m)	9 ft 10 in (3.00 m)	19 reps
All values from Pro Day

=== Washington Commanders ===
Rucker signed with the Washington Commanders as an undrafted free agent on May 8, 2025, but was waived three days later.

=== Toronto Argonauts ===
On February 9, 2026, it was announced that Rucker had signed with the Toronto Argonauts. He was released on May 13.
