= Biohabitats =

American company that provides conservation planning

Biohabitats, Inc.
- Industry: Environmental Consulting
- Predecessor: Greenspring Environmental Design
- Founded: Baltimore, Maryland (1982)
- Founder: Keith Bowers
- Headquarters: Baltimore, Maryland, U.S.
- Number of employees: 75
- Website: biohabitats.com

Biohabitats, Inc. is an American company that provides conservation planning, ecological restoration and regenerative design services.

Biohabitats employs about 75 people with expertise in biological sciences, earth sciences, water engineering, land planning, and design. The company's headquarters is in Baltimore, Maryland.

== History ==
Biohabitats was founded in 1982 by landscape architect and restorationist Keith Bowers, who remains its president in 2016.

Biohabitats’ planning work has included the preparation of climate adaptation strategies for the Galveston Island State Park master plan. Its wetland restorations have included Nine Mile Run in Pittsburgh's Frick Park and the restoration of natural water flow to Barataria Preserve in Louisiana's Jean Lafitte National Historical Park and Preserve.

In the early 2000s, Biohabitats expanded its services to include more stormwater design and work in urban areas. The company worked with the New York City Department of Environmental Protection to prioritize vacant lands and modernize practices for stormwater management. At Freshkills Park, also in New York City, Biohabitats restored coastal wetland habitat on a former landfill.

In 2005, Biohabitats moved its offices into a converted horse barn in the Woodberry neighborhood of Baltimore City.

Biohabitats acquired Natural Systems International in 2010, and subsequently expanded its services to include the design of decentralized natural wastewater treatment systems, including Sidwell Friends School in Washington DC, and the Omnilife Stadium in Guadalajara, Mexico.

In the 2010s, the company worked with Underwood & Associates to develop Regenerative Stormwater Conveyance. Biohabitats designed a floating wetland for the Waterfront Partnership in Baltimore’s Inner Harbor floating wetlands that was constructed from floating debris found in surrounding urban waterways. Biohabitats also created a natural water treatment system based on algae in the harbor.

In 2016 Biohabitats managed the restoration of Larder's Point Park on the Delaware River and Washington Avenue Green in Philadelphia.

== Awards and honors ==
In 2016, Biohabitats received a Top Ten Projects award from the American Institute of Architects. Then in 2015 Engineering & Science Award of Excellence from the Pittsburgh American Institute of Architects, the 2015 Society for College and University Planning award, and again in 2016 the Louisiana Chapter President's Award of Excellence and the 2016 ASLA Analysis and Planning Honor Award as part of the planning team for the Baton Rouge Lakes Master Plan.
