= Georgetown Day School =

Location
- 4200 Davenport St NW; Washington, D.C. 20016; United States; 38°57′07″N 77°04′59″W

Information
- Type: Private; Preparatory school
- Established: 1945 (81 years ago)
- CEEB code: 090081
- Head of school: Tori Jueds
- Faculty: 165
- Enrollment: 1075
- Average class size: 16
- Student to teacher ratio: 6:1
- Campus size: 10 acres (4.0 ha)
- Colors: Green and white
- Athletics: 14 interscholastic sports 63 interscholastic teams
- Athletics conference: Mid-Atlantic Athletic Conference (boys); Independent School League (girls)
- Mascot: Grasshopper
- Website: www.gds.org

Georgetown Day School (GDS) is an independent coeducational PK-12 school located in Washington, D.C. The school educates 1,075 elementary, middle, and high school students in northwestern Washington, D.C. Tori Jueds is the Head of School.

Founded in 1945 by anthropologists Philleo and Edith R. Nash, as Washington's first racially integrated school, it is known for its progressive climate and dedication to social justice. Students call teachers by their first names, and the high school allows students to leave the campus during school hours.

== Academics ==
The school has educated the children of several high-ranking government officials, including Justice Thurgood Marshall, Justice Ruth Bader Ginsburg, Vice President Walter Mondale, United States Attorney General Eric Holder, United States Assistant Attorney General Matthew G. Olsen, Agriculture Secretary Dan Glickman, United States Deputy Secretary of Education Jim Shelton III, Treasury Secretary Larry Summers, Texas Senator Phil Gramm, Oregon Senator Ron Wyden, Florida Congressman Kendrick Meek, Washington DC Congresswoman Eleanor Holmes Norton, Maryland Congressman Jamie Raskin, Louisiana Senator Mary Landrieu, Secretary of Homeland Security Alejandro Mayorkas, as well as Supreme Court Justice Ketanji Brown Jackson.

Georgetown Day recently finished construction on the new lower and middle school campus (2021), thereby unifying the high school and lower/middle school campuses. The school constructed both campuses in Tenleytown. The project raised over $52 million from more than 2,000 donors, surpassing the $50 million fundraising goal.

Each year, the school sponsors the Ben Cooper Lecture in memory of a student killed in a car accident in 1997.

== Notable alumni ==
- Elliot Ackerman, decorated veteran and author
- James Alefantis, owner of Comet Ping Pong
- Kelly AuCoin, actor
- Schuyler Bailar, first openly transgender NCAA Division I swimmer
- Stephanie Burt, literary critic and poet
- Jake Blount, musician, scholar, and activist.
- Max Blumenthal
- Ben Dolnick, writer
- Sam Dolnick, Award-winning journalist, assistant managing editor of The New York Times
- Sean Fine, documentary filmmaker, best known for the Academy Award-nominated War/Dance
- Ruben Fleischer, film director
- Franklin Foer, The New Republic editor
- Jonathan Safran Foer, novelist and professor of creative writing at New York University
- Joshua Foer, freelance journalist and author of Moonwalking with Einstein
- Gina Gionfriddo, playwright and television writer. Twice a finalist for the Pulitzer Prize for Drama.
- Jonathan Glickman, film producer and studio executive.
- Andrew Sean Greer, Pulitzer prize-winning American author
- Saskia Hamilton, poet and academic
- Lauren Hogg, gun control activist, author, and co-founder of March for Our Lives
- Matthew Kaminski, Editor in Chief of political news company Politico
- Aidan Kohn-Murphy, Political Activist and Founder of Gen-Z for Change
- Judy Kuhn, Tony-nominated theatre actress, known for her originating roles in Les Misérables, Chess, and Fun Home, as well as being the singing voice for Pocahontas in the Disney film Pocahontas
- Ben Mankiewicz, host of Turner Classic Movies producer and actor
- Thurgood Marshall Jr., partner at Bingham McCutchen, LLP, chairman of the Board of the Governors USPS, Assistant to the President and Secretary to the Cabinet at Clinton Administration
- Judith Martin, journalist, author, and etiquette authority
- Conor McDermott-Mostowy, Olympic speed skater
- Sam Means, comedy writer for The Daily Show with Jon Stewart, 30 Rock, and Parks and Recreation; producer on Unbreakable Kimmy Schmidt
- Guy Picciotto, singer, songwriter, guitarist, musician, and producer, most widely known for his role as guitarist and vocalist in Fugazi and Rites of Spring
- Members of Gray Matter (band).
- Alice Randall, American author and songwriter of African-American descent. She is perhaps best known for her novel The Wind Done Gone, a reinterpretation and parody of the popular 1936 novel Gone with the Wind.
- Jamie Raskin, elected to House of Representatives from Maryland and bestselling author
- Noah Robbins, American actor
- Paul Shapiro, vice president of farm animal protection for the Humane Society of the United States
- Kevin Sheekey, political consultant
- Ethan Slater, actor, singer, writer, and composer, best known for his Tony-nominated role as SpongeBob SquarePants in the musical SpongeBob SquarePants
- Gianmarco Soresi, comedian and actor
- Sarah Stillman, journalist and winner of the 2012 George Polk Award, the 2012 Hillman Prize, and a 2016 MacArthur Fellowship
- Mattilda Bernstein Sycamore, author and activist
- Greta Titelman, actress, comedian, and writer.
- Olivia Wilde, film and television actress, starred in House
- Sophia Yilma, journalist and politician
