= Sidwell Friends School =

Washington, D.C. area PreK-12 school

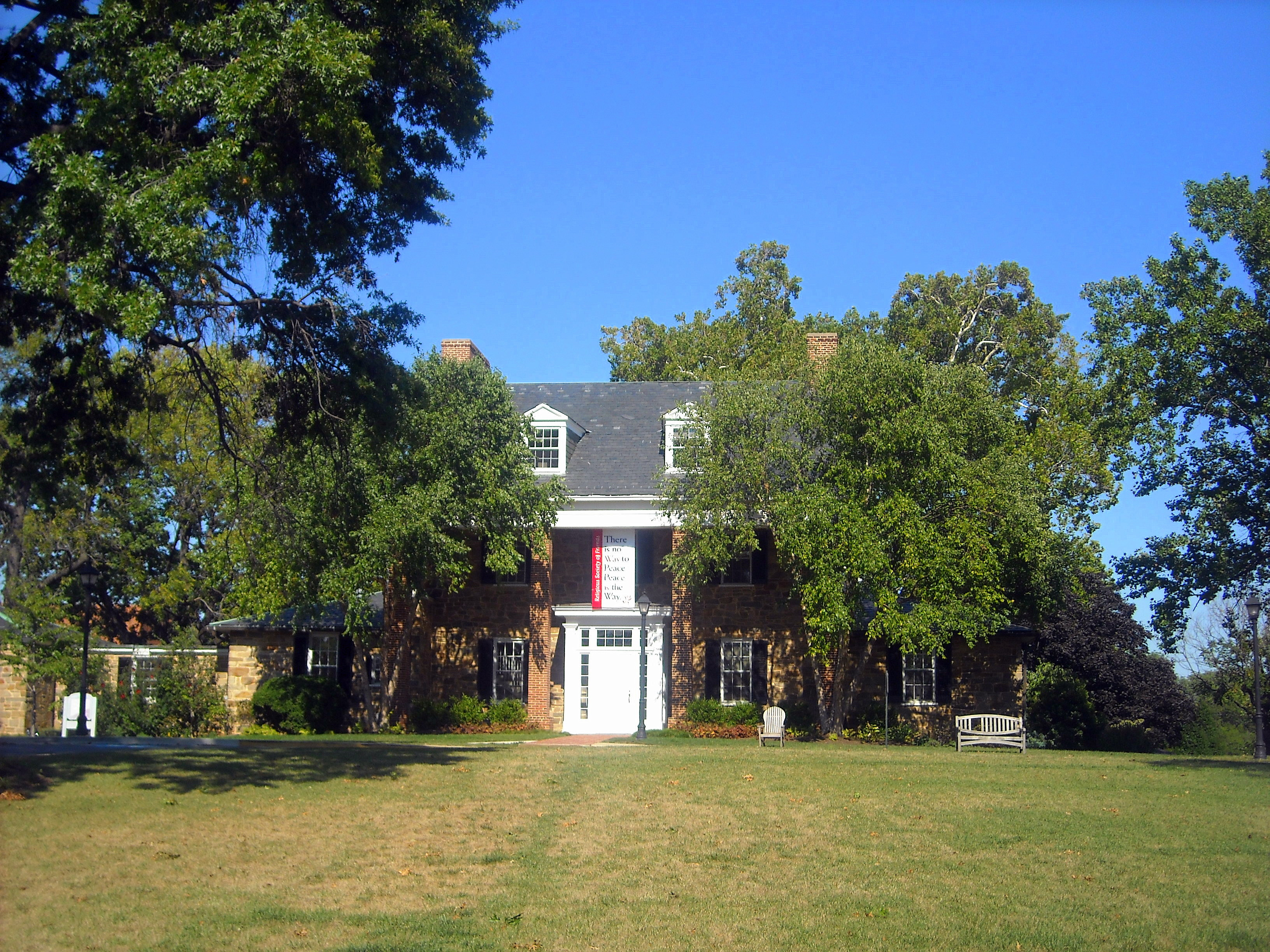
- The Sidwell Friends school administration building in Washington, D.C. (2008)

Location
- Bethesda, Maryland (Lower School); Washington, D.C. (Middle/Upper School); United States; 38°56′21″N 77°04′29″W

Information
- Type: Private, Day, College-prep
- Motto: Eluceat Omnibus Lux ("Let the light shine out from all")
- Religious affiliation: Quakers
- Established: 1883 (143 years ago)
- CEEB code: 090200
- Head of school: Bryan K. Garman
- Faculty: 257
- Grades: PK–12
- Gender: Co-educational
- Enrollment: 1,152
- Colors: Maroon & Gray
- Athletics conference: MAC (boys); ISL (girls)
- Mascot: Fox
- Team name: Quakers
- Publication: The Oat (the satirical student newspaper); Quarterly (the art magazine); Student Political Review (student editorial newspaper); Sidwell Business Review (student editorial newsletter)
- Newspaper: Horizon
- Endowment: $81.1 million (2024)
- Tuition: Lower school: $53,470–$56,080; Middle school: $59,440; Upper school: $59,920 (2025-26)
- Website: sidwell.edu

Sidwell Friends School is a private, college preparatory, Quaker school located in Bethesda, Maryland, and Washington, D.C., offering pre-kindergarten through high school classes. Founded in 1883 by Thomas W. Sidwell, its motto is "Eluceat omnibus lux" (English: Let the light shine out from all), alluding to the Quaker concept of inward light.

The school is private with a merit-based admissions process. As documented on the school's website, it gives preference in admissions decisions to members of the Religious Society of Friends, but otherwise does not discriminate on the basis of religion. In 2013, Sidwell was said to accept only 7 percent of applicants. The school accepts vouchers under the D.C. Opportunity Scholarship Program.

The school has educated children of notable politicians, including those of several presidents. President Theodore Roosevelt's son Archibald, President Richard Nixon's daughters Tricia and Julie when he was vice president, President Bill Clinton's daughter Chelsea, President Barack Obama's daughters Sasha and Malia, President Joe Biden's grandchildren when he was vice president and Vice President Al Gore's son, Albert III, all attended Sidwell Friends.

== History ==
=== 19th century ===
Thomas Sidwell started a "Friends' Select School" in 1883 on I Street in downtown Washington, four blocks from the White House. It opened with just eleven students.

=== 20th century ===
In 1911, Sidwell began buying property between Wisconsin Avenue and 37th St. Initially, the new property was used for athletic fields—and, with the central campus's downtown location—meant students had to shuttle between the two sites by streetcar. However, in 1923, Sidwell built a building for school dances and other social gatherings on what came to be known as the Wisconsin Avenue campus.

In 1925, the school added a kindergarten, making it the first K–12 school in Washington, D.C. In 1934, the name of the school was changed to "Sidwell and Friends School." In 1938 it acquired the former Washington, D.C. estate of Rear admiral Cary T. Grayson, Highlands, and began its gradual re-location to its Wisconsin Avenue building. By 1938, the transition to the new building had been completed, and the I Street property was sold.

In 1957, the school adopted a formal dress code policy, with requirements and recommendations for boys and girls in Kindergarten, Lower School, Middle School, and Upper School. The dress code continued to evolve to include further restrictions on hair length, skirt length, and types of shoes in the 1960s, but began to relax by 1969. Following student proposals and negotiations, the dress code was modified in the early 1970s and by 1975 permitted jeans to be worn by students. The dress code continued to evolve in the 1980s and by 2000 included restrictions on exposed midriffs and visible underwear. In 2016, students led a change to the dress code to ban clothing with the Washington Redskins (currently the Commanders) football team name and logo.

Previously, all grade levels were in Washington, D.C. In 1963, the elementary school moved to the former Longfellow School for Boys, purchased by Sidwell Friends.

Sidwell became racially integrated in 1964. In the decades following integration, problems faced by black students led to the creation of two parent groups outside the school, which sought to alleviate covert prejudice.

=== 21st century ===
In 2009, Thomas B. Farquhar became the Head of School after the retirement of Bruce Stewart. Following the 2013-2014 school year, Farquhar was removed from his position as the Head of School.

In 2018, Sidwell, along with seven other Washington metropolitan area private schools, announced that they would be eliminating AP courses, citing the declining impact on one's college acceptance chances that AP courses were having, and a want to diversify their class offerings. This sparked the Department of Justice to launch an antitrust investigation into the schools, which concluded in 2021 after the DOJ stated that "in light of the burden on the Schools associated with the ongoing pandemic, the division will not bring an enforcement action against the Schools".

In April 2020, the school received $5.2 million in federally backed small business loans as part of the Paycheck Protection Program. The school received scrutiny over this loan, which was meant to protect small and private businesses. Treasury Secretary Steven Mnuchin tweeted that the schools should return the money, but the school stated they were keeping it, despite having a then $53 million endowment.

As of 2026, the school plans to move elementary grades back to Washington, D.C. by 2028 and consolidate the whole school on the Wisconsin Avenue campus. This was made possible by its purchase in December 2016 of the adjacent property of The Washington Home. That property had been operated as a nursing home under the earlier name of The Home for Incurables. Renovations on The Washington Home building finished in 2026 and the Upper School started there in Fall 2026.

== Academics ==
In 2005, Sidwell's AP English Exam scores were the highest in the nation for all medium-sized schools (300–799 students in grades 10–12) offering the AP English exam.

All students must acquire at least 20 credits before graduating. Students are required to take four years of English, three years of mathematics, three years of history, two years of one foreign language, two years of science, and two years of art. In addition to this, all freshmen must take a full year Ninth Grade Studies course that involves a service project. Tenth and eleventh graders must also take courses corresponding to their grade level.

Sidwell is a member school of School Year Abroad.

== Student safety ==
In 2016, the school revised its policy on sexual misconduct after reports that a teen had been raped by her ex-boyfriend on the school's campus. No charges were filed against the teen, and the school installed more security cameras to deter future assaults. Despite the measures, a year later another teenage female student reported being raped on the campus grounds by a fellow student.

Former Sidwell psychologist and sex ed teacher James Huntington was the target of a 2013 lawsuit for his affair with the parent of a student he was counseling. The case exposed teachers that had made advances towards students.

In 2017, the school fired a middle school music teacher, Michael Henderson, who had been accused of having inappropriate contact with a 14-year-old girl at a previous school. In 1996, the parents of Sara Lawson, a student at the Fountain Valley School, filed a police report that detailed multiple incidents of "unwanted touching and kissing" between her and Henderson while she was 14. She later stated that Henderson once invited her over to his house and made her a drink that caused her to be incapacitated for the rest of the night. In a letter Sidwell's Head of School Bryan Garman sent to parents, he stated that "A former administrator ... was aware that Michael’s departure from his previous employer had been precipitated by his inappropriate conduct, but had no knowledge of the severity of the allegations as they now stand."

== Athletics ==
Sidwell's athletic teams are known as the Quakers; their colors are maroon and gray. The Quakers compete in the Mid-Atlantic Athletic Conference (MAC) for boys' sports (after previously competing in the Interstate Athletic Conference (IAC) until 1999) and the Independent School League (ISL) for girls' sports. Sidwell offers teams in volleyball, golf, boys and girls cross country, football, field hockey, girls and boys soccer, boys and girls basketball, boys and girls swimming and diving, wrestling, boys and girls tennis, baseball, boys and girls lacrosse, boys and girls track, ultimate frisbee, crew, movement performance and choreography, and softball.

=== Basketball ===
The women's basketball is consistently a top program in the DMV area. The Quakers completed an undefeated season from 2021 to 2022 and were ranked the #1 best girls' basketball team in the nation by recruiting website MaxPreps as well as by ESPN. In the 2022–2023 season, the team won their second straight DCSAA state championship in a 68–49 win against St. Johns. Led by Coach Tamika Dudley and Duke commit Jadyn Donovan, the consensus #3 recruit in the class of 2023, the team was once again ranked as the top team in the nation by various recruiting websites and sports journalism pages after compiling a 28–3 record.

The men's team is another program in the DMV area, finishing the 2022–2023 season with a state championship, two conference championships (regular season and tournament) and 27–4 record.

== Current profile ==
- For the 2026–2027 school year, 1,144 students are enrolled.
- 57% of the student body are people of color.
- 65.3% of the student body receives some form of financial assistance.
- The school employs 273 full-time teachers and staff.
- 84% of faculty hold advanced degrees.
- Tuition for the 2026–2027 school year ranges from $55,250 for grades PK-2, to $62,330 for Upper School.
- The school does not compute GPAs or assign rankings to its students, nor does it release score averages for the SAT and ACT. However, it does publish a list of institutions at which recently graduated students have matriculated.
- As of 2026, Sidwell Friends School is rated the 20th Best Private K-12 School in the US by Niche.

== Campuses ==
The Middle and Upper School campus is located at 3825 Wisconsin Avenue, N.W., Washington, D.C., 20016-2907

- 15-acre (6.1 ha) Wisconsin Avenue campus in the North Cleveland Park section of Northwest Washington
- Earl G. Harrison Jr. Upper School Building (renovations are underway to transform this building into the new lower school)
- Upton Upper School Building
- Middle School building with Leadership in Energy and Environmental Design (LEED) Platinum Certification, designed by architect KieranTimberlake Associates and landscape design by Andropogon Associates. The wood-clad building was designed around a sustainable use of water and energy, exemplified by a constructed wetland in the center of the campus, with many species of plants, as well as turtles and fish, part of a wastewater recycling system designed by Biohabitats. On the interior, the building uses thermal chimneys and louvers that admit diffuse light to limit the need for artificial light and thermal control. Lastly, the building contains a centralized mechanical plant that uses less energy than normal, much of which is produced by photovoltaic banks on the roof. The materials used and the environmental technology are referenced architecturally and made accessible to students, either physically, or by explanatory signs, as an educational feature.
- Kogod Center for the Arts
- Richard Walter Goldman Memorial Library
- Zartman House (administration building)
- Wannan and Kenworthy Gymnasiums
- Three athletic fields, five tennis courts, and two tracks (one 2-lane indoor track indoor for bad weather and an outdoor 6-lane track for competitions).
- Parking facility with faculty, student, guest and alumni parking (2 floors, 200+ parking spaces), as well as offices for security, IT and maintenance

The Lower School campus can be found at 5100 Edgemoor Lane, Bethesda, Montgomery County, Maryland, 20814-2306

- 5-acre (2.0 ha) Edgemoor Lane campus in Bethesda (formerly Longfellow School for Boys; opened for the 1963–64 school year)
- Manor House (classrooms, administration, and Clark Library)
- Groome Building (classrooms and multi-purpose room)
- Science, Art, and Music (SAM) Building
- The Bethesda Friends Meeting House
- Athletic fields, a gymnasium, and two playgrounds

Both campuses underwent major renovations throughout the 2005–2006 school year, and construction for the Wisconsin Avenue campus Athletic Center (which includes the Kenworthy Courts) was completed in 2011.

Construction of the new Upton Upper School building began in June 2024 on the former site of the Washington Home & Community Hospices nursing home. In September 2026, Sidwell Friends opened the new building for grades 9-12.

Sidwell Friends plans to move the Lower School to the site of the former high school building on the Wisconsin Avenue campus. This move is planned to take place in 2028. Construction began after the completion of the Upton Upper School building.

== Notable alumni ==
=== Activism ===
- Tracye McQuirter (1984), vegan activist
- Vanessa Wruble (1992), co-founder of 2017 Women's March

=== Arts ===
- Oteil Burbridge (1982), bassist for Dead & Company and the Allman Brothers Band
- Alyson Cambridge (born 1980), operatic soprano and classical music, jazz, and American popular song singer
- Sonya Clark (1985), artist
- Liza Donnelly (1973), cartoonist for The New Yorker
- Jeffrey Mumford (1973), composer
- Malinda Kathleen Reese, YouTube personality, actress and singer

=== Business ===
- Tom Bernthal, American marketing CEO and former NBC News producer
- Nick Friedman (2000), entrepreneur
- Daniel Mudd (1976), former CEO of Fannie Mae
- Omar Soliman (2000), author and entrepreneur

=== Crime ===
- William Zantzinger, convicted killer and subject of the Bob Dylan song, "The Lonesome Death of Hattie Carroll"

=== Education ===
- George A. Akerlof, Nobel Prize winner for Economics and current faculty member at Georgetown University
- Alida Anderson (1987), American University special education researcher.
- Hanna Holborn Gray (1947 or 1948), historian and Provost of Yale University and later the President of University of Chicago
- Philip S. Khoury (1967), Ford International Professor of History and Vice Provost, MIT

=== Government and law ===
- David W. Dennis (1929), Indiana congressman
- John Deutch (1956), Central Intelligence Agency Director, MIT professor
- Roger W. Ferguson, Jr. (1969), Federal Reserve Board Former vice-chairman
- Michael Froomkin, academic lawyer
- Doug Gansler (1981), State's Attorney for Montgomery County, Maryland (1999–2007), Attorney General of Maryland, (2007–2015)
- William Henry Harrison III (1914 or 1915), Republican Representative from Wyoming and great-great-grandson of President William Henry Harrison
- Robert F. Kennedy Jr. (transferred to Georgetown Preparatory School), Secretary of Health and Human Services
- Nancy Reagan, former First Lady (attended the elementary school 1925–1928)
- Oleg Alexandrovich Troyanovsky, Soviet ambassador to the United Nations
- Edward Tylor Miller (1912 or 1913), Maryland congressman
- Katherine Tai, US Trade Representative
- Elizabeth Wilkins (2001), director of the office of policy planning at the Federal Trade Commission

=== Health ===
- Sarah Szanton (1984), dean, Johns Hopkins School of Nursing

=== Journalism ===
- Anne Applebaum (1982), journalist and author
- John Dickerson (1987), journalist, political commentator, and writer.
- Dan Froomkin (1981), journalist and Huffington Post columnist
- Anand Giridharadas (1999), journalist and author of Winners Take All: The Elite Charade of Changing the World
- Charles Gibson (1961), ABC World News Tonight anchor, host of ABC's Good Morning America
- James K Glassman (1965), editorialist, syndicated columnist, and author
- Tony Horwitz (1976), journalist and author
- Clara Jeffery (1985), editor of Mother Jones magazine

=== Literature and poetry ===
- Elizabeth Alexander (1980), poet
- Ann Brashares (1985), author of The Sisterhood of the Traveling Pants series of books
- Margaret Edson (1979), Pulitzer Prize–winning author of Wit
- John Katzenbach (1968), author
- Campbell McGrath (1980), poet and winner of the MacArthur Foundation "Genius Award"
- Brian Pohanka, Civil War author and historian
- Susan Shreve (1957), professor, author and novelist
- Lorin Stein, editor in chief of The Paris Review
- Andrew Szanton (1981), author
- Philip Terzian (1961–66) Author and journalist, Literary Editor of The Weekly Standard
- John Dos Passos, (attended 1902–1903)
- Gore Vidal

=== Film and television ===
- Jon Bernthal (1995), actor
- Ezra Edelman (1992), Emmy Award-winning documentary producer and director
- Ana Gasteyer (1985), actress; cast member of Saturday Night Live
- Davis Guggenheim (1982), film director, An Inconvenient Truth among others
- Thomas Kail (1995), director
- Nana Meriwether (2003), Miss USA 2012
- Robert Newmyer (1974), film producer
- Eliza Orlins, contestant on Survivor: Vanuatu, Survivor: Micronesia, and The Amazing Race 31
- Scott Sanders (1986), director of Black Dynamite
- Baratunde Thurston (1995), comedian
- Alexandra Tydings (1989), actress
- Robin Weigert (1987), actress

=== Children of U.S. presidents ===
- Chelsea Clinton (1997), daughter of President Bill Clinton and future Secretary of State Hillary Clinton
- Tricia Nixon (1964) daughter of future President Richard Nixon
- Julie Nixon (1966) daughter of future President Richard Nixon
- Malia Obama (2016), daughter of President Barack Obama
- Sasha Obama (2019), daughter of President Barack Obama
- Archibald Roosevelt (1907), son of President Theodore Roosevelt

=== Royalty ===
- Setsuko, Princess Chichibu, member of the Japanese imperial family (attended 1925–1928)

=== Science and technology ===
- Stephen Chanock (1974) physician, geneticist
- Walter Gilbert (1949), Nobel Prize winner in Chemistry
- Charles Lindbergh (attended 1913–1915)
- Bill Nye (1973), science communicator
- John Terborgh (1954) Biologist, conservationist
- Ward Watt (1958) evolutionary biologist

=== Sports ===
- Saddiq Bey (2018), professional basketball player, Washington Wizards
- Jadyn Donovan (2023), college basketball player
- Paul Goldstein (1994), professional tennis player, 4-time NCAA Champion and All-American at Stanford, 2-time USTA 18 & Under national champion.
- Josh Hart (2013), basketball player, New York Knicks first-round selection of 2017 NBA draft
- Kara Lawson (1999, left in 1996), head coach of Duke Blue Devils women's basketball, former WNBA player and star at the University of Tennessee, 5th pick of the 2003 WNBA draft.
- Acaden Lewis (2025), college basketball player
- Jair Lynch (1989), gymnast, 1996 Olympic Silver Medalist in parallel bars
- Roger Mason (1999, left in 1996) NBA player for the San Antonio Spurs and star at the University of Virginia, 31st pick of the 2002 NBA draft.
- John Patrick (1987), basketball coach
- Natalie Randolph (1999), former football coach Coolidge High School in Washington, D.C.
- Kiki Rice (2022), college basketball player
- Walter Rouse (2019), college football player
- Ed Tapscott (1971), former American University basketball coach and Washington Wizards interim head coach

== Sister schools ==
- High School affiliated to Fudan University
- The Second High School Attached to Beijing Normal University
- Ramallah Friends Schools
- Moses Brown School
