= St. Andrew's Episcopal School (Maryland) =

Private school in Potomac, Maryland, US

Location
- 8804 Postoak Rd; Potomac, Maryland 20854; United States; 39°2′46″N 77°10′35″W

Information
- School type: Private
- Motto: Auctus Mentis Spiritusque (The Increase of Mind and Spirit)
- Denomination: Episcopal
- Established: September 1978; 48 years ago
- CEEB code: 210317
- Head of school: Robert Kosasky
- Grades: Preschool through 12
- Enrollment: 735 (2025-2026)
- Campus size: 19.2 acres (7.8 ha)
- Campus type: Suburban
- Colors: Red and white
- Mascot: Lions
- Tuition: $49,680 for grades 9-12 2023-24 Academic year
- Website: www.saes.org

St. Andrew's Episcopal School is a coeducational college preparatory independent school for preschool, beginning at age two, through grade twelve. St. Andrew's is located at 8804 Postoak Road, Potomac, Maryland, in Montgomery County. As of 2025–2026, total enrollment is 735. The student to faculty ratio is 6:1.

== Academics ==
The school operates on trimesters. Students in grades 6–12 attend on average four classes per day (this varies depending on grade, special schedules, and other factors). Upper School and Middle School students take five major academic courses per year – English, History, Language, Mathematics, and Science. Religion, art (visual and performing) and athletics are required at least one trimester per year.

In 2011, the school founded the Center for Transformative Teaching and Learning (CTTL), a professional development program for its faculty which develops the school's curriculum. The Chan Zuckerberg Initiative contributed $1 million to this effort. Other Donors include Crimsonbridge Foundation, The J. Willard and Alice S. Marriott Foundation, Discovery Learning Alliance, National Philanthropic Trust, Silicon Valley Community Foundation, The Chan Zuckerberg Initiative (CZI), Linkages Fund, Edward E.Ford Foundation, Windover Foundation, Omidyar Group, Bill and Melinda Gates Foundation, Carney, Sandoe & Associates, Pathway 2 Tomorrow, Bezos Family Foundation, The Charles Koch Institute, Charles Koch Institute, Omidyar Network.

Begun in 1998, the Oral History project, the signature academic program in the Upper School, houses one of the largest pre-collegiate collection of oral histories in North America.

The school is a member of College Entrance Examination Board, Cum Laude Society, National Association of College Admissions Counseling, National Association of Independent Schools, National Association of Episcopal Schools, and Potomac & Chesapeake Association of College Admissions Counseling. It is fully accredited by the Association of Independent Maryland Schools, Maryland State Department of Education, and Middle States Association of Colleges and Schools. Advanced Placement classes are available in fourteen disciplines.

== Notable alumni and students ==
- Pierre Omidyar, founder of eBay and philanthropist with Omidyar Network.
- Whitney Cummings, actress, comedian, author, and co-creator of 2 Broke Girls sitcom.
- Melissa d'Arabian, Food Network personality, cook, author.
- Steven Levenson, Tony Award-winner for Best Book of a Musical for "Dear Evan Hansen".
- Kate Siegel, actress and screenwriter.
- Barron Trump, son of 45th and 47th President of the United States Donald Trump. (Did not graduate)
- Nitya Vidyasagar, actress
- Tinoda Matsatsa, Track Athlete, first black high schooler to break 4 minutes in the mile
