= Maret School =

Private school in Washington, D.C., US

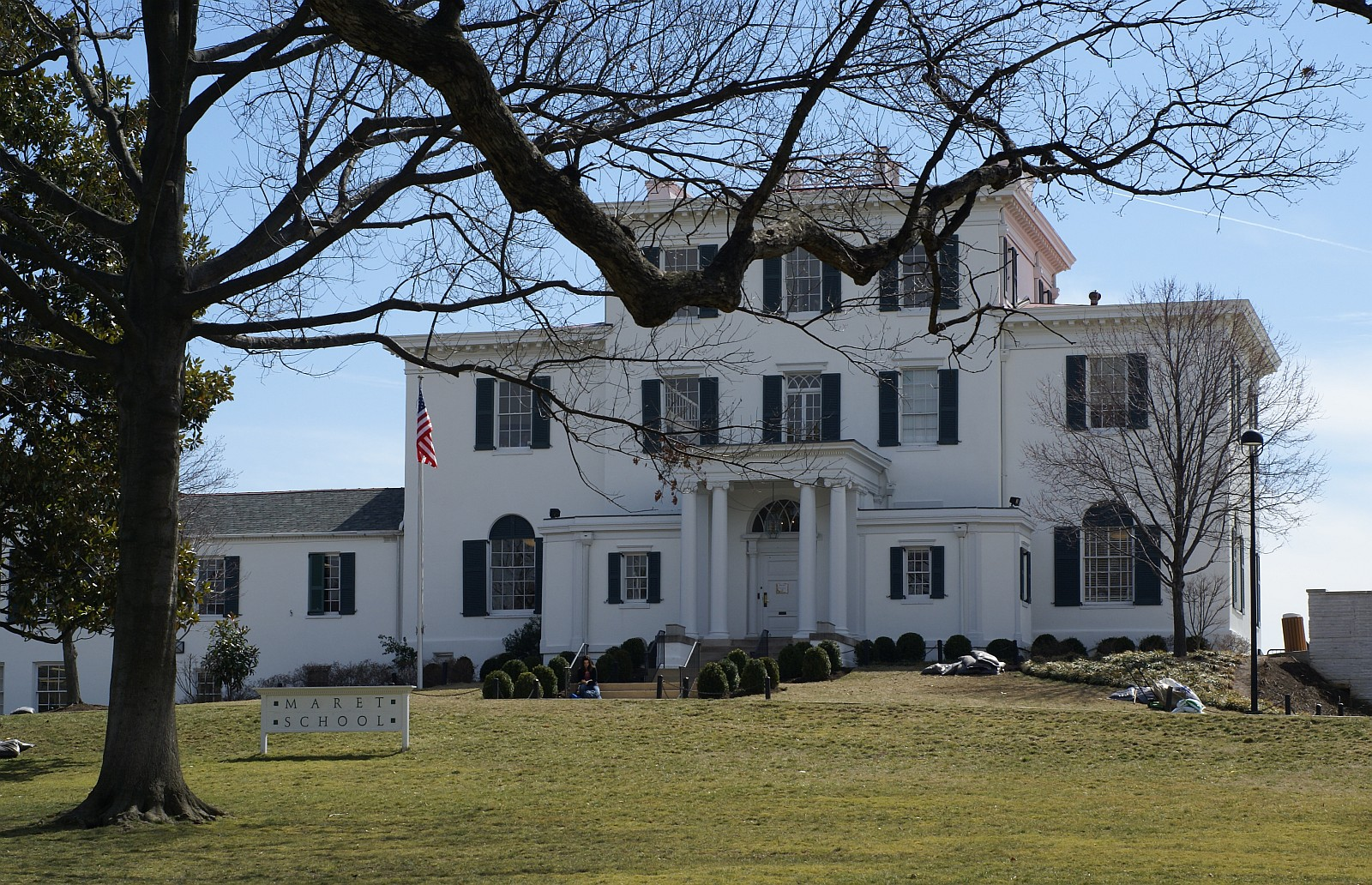
- Woodley Mansion houses the Maret School.

Location
- 3000 Cathedral Avenue, NW; Washington, DC 20008; United States; 38°55′42″N 77°03′36″W

Information
- Motto: Noscere Vivere Est: "To Learn is to Live"
- Established: 1911 (115 years ago)
- Founder: Marthe Maret
- Category: Independent
- CEEB code: 090115
- Headmaster: Dennis Bisgaard
- Grades: K–12
- Gender: Coeducational
- Enrollment: 650
- Campus type: Urban
- Colors: Forest green and white
- Athletics: Cross country, football, golf, soccer, tennis, volleyball, basketball, swimming, wrestling, baseball, lacrosse, softball, track and field, Ultimate Frisbee
- Athletics conference: MAC (boys); ISL (girls)
- Nickname: Fighting Frogs
- Accreditation: Association of Independent Maryland Schools (AIMS)
- Newspaper: The Woodley Leaves
- Yearbook: The Woodley Oaks
- Tuition: Lower school: $46,570; Middle school: $50,445; Upper school: $53,545 (2025-26)
- Website: www.maret.org

Maret School is an independent, non-sectarian, college-preparatory day school in Washington, DC with 650 students in grades K–12. Three immigrant sisters, Marthe, Louise, and Jeanne Maret, left their home in Geneva, Switzerland at the turn of the twentieth century and created the school in 1911.

== History ==
In the late 1800s and early 1900s, three French sisters, Mlles. Marthe, Louise, and Jeanne Maret, left their home in the village of Marignan (Sciez) in France close by Geneva, Switzerland, to teach. Louise taught in Russia, Jeanne in the Philippines, and Marthe (who became blind at age 18), in Washington, D.C.

By 1911, Louise and Jeanne had joined Marthe in Washington, where they were inspired to bring an international flavor to education. They founded the Maret French School, later named Maret School. In 1923, the sisters moved the school to 2118 Kalorama Road with an enrollment of 62 culturally diverse students.

By 1950, Margaret Williams had joined the school, which she led for the next 18 years. In 1952, growing enrollment compelled the school's board of trustees to secure a larger campus at 3000 Cathedral Avenue, NW. In 1953, boys were admitted to the Upper School. By 1966, enrollment totaled 375 students.

Maret School was led by three headmasters throughout the late 1960s and early 1970s: William Laxner, William Layton, and John Francis. Starting in the mid-1970s, Peter A. Sturtevant Sr. led Maret for two decades. To accommodate a growing enrollment, the school added additional facilities for athletics, arts, and academics.

Marjo Talbott replaced Sturtevant as headmaster in 1994. After serving Maret for 29 years, she retired in 2023 and was succeeded by Dennis Bisgaard.

== Current profile ==
Maret's student body consists of 650 students. 54% of students and 39% of faculty identify as People of Color. 71% of faculty hold advanced degrees. 26% of students receive financial aid.

== Notable alumni ==
- Peter Matthew Bauer: musician
- Sean Davis: professional football player for the Pittsburgh Steelers
- Anthony Dobbins: professional basketball player and coach
- Luka Garza: professional basketball player for the Boston Celtics
- Catie Lazarus: entertainer, writer
- Sonja Lyubomirsky: professor in the Department of Psychology at the University of California, Riverside; author of The How of Happiness
- J. Lorand Matory: anthropology professor at Duke University
- Christof Putzel: journalist
- Theodore Shapiro: composer best known for film scores, including State and Main, 13 Going on 30, Along Came Polly, The Devil Wears Prada, and Fun with Dick and Jane
- Yeardley Smith: actress best known for voicing Lisa Simpson on The Simpsons
- Josh Stamberg: actor
- Dan van Holst Pellekaan: deputy premier of South Australia
- Rosalind Wiseman: author of the 2002 New York Times best-selling book Queen Bees and Wannabes, the basis of the 2004 film Mean Girls
