= Potomac School (McLean, Virginia) =

The Potomac School
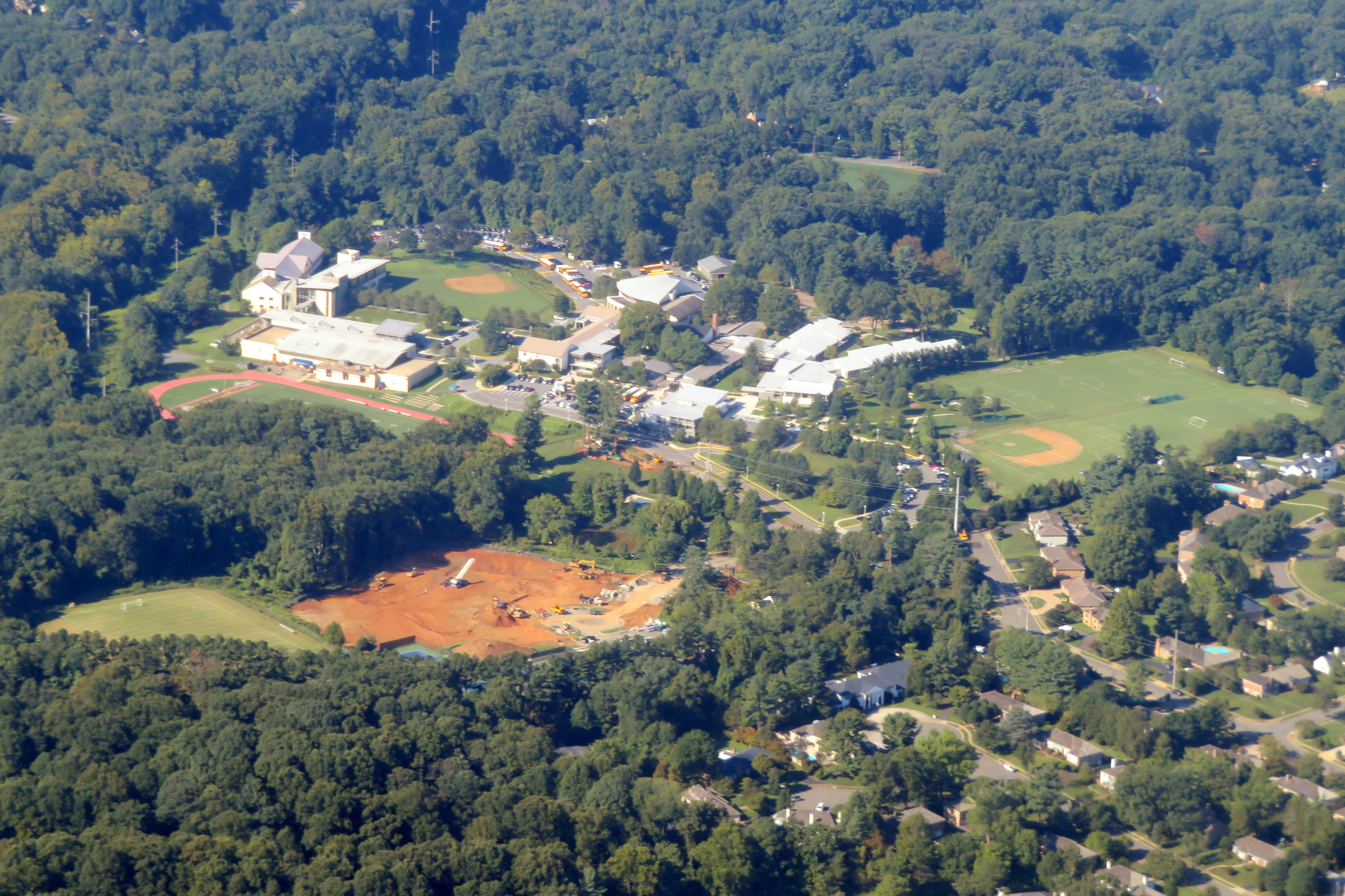
- Aerial view of the school in September 2018

Location
- 1301 Potomac School Road; McLean, Virginia 22101; United States; 38°56′10″N 77°9′20″W

Information
- Type: Independent school
- Motto: Labor Omnia Vincet "Labor Will Conquer All"
- Established: 1904
- Headmaster: John Kowalik
- Teaching staff: 182 (2021-22)
- Grades: K–12
- Gender: Coeducational
- Enrollment: 1066
- Colors: Blue, White, and Orange
- Nickname: Panthers
- Website: www.potomacschool.org
- ^{*}Per school website, December 14, 2021. "https://www.potomacschool.org/about-us/quick-facts/">

The Potomac School is a coeducational, college-preparatory independent day school located on a wooded 90-acre campus in McLean, Virginia, United States, three miles (5 km) from Washington, D.C. Average class size is 15–17 students. For the 2021–22 school year, Potomac enrolled 1,066 students in grades K-12. The school has four divisions – Lower School (K- 3), Middle School (4–6), Intermediate School (7–8), and Upper School (9–12) – each providing a balanced educational experience.

== History ==
At the turn of the 20th century, three Washington, D.C. residents, Edith Draper Blair, Hetty Fairfax Harrison, and Ellen Warder Thoron traveled to New York City to research John Dewey's teaching model and educational philosophy. The women's interest in early childhood education as a joyful and enriching endeavor led them to found The Potomac School in 1904. The school's original location was in the Dupont Circle neighborhood of Washington, D.C.

In 1906, Potomac relocated to 18th and M Streets NW; a decade later, the school, at that point enrolling students through grade 8, moved to a larger facility at 2144 California Street in Northwest Washington, D.C.

Looking toward greater future expansion, Potomac's board of trustees purchased 55 acres of farmland in McLean, Virginia, in 1948. The ensuing years brought significant growth, with additions of land and facilities, an increase in the student population, and the addition of new programs. In 1987, Potomac added an Upper School to serve students in grades 9–12. The first senior class graduated from The Potomac School in 1990, and in 2004 the school celebrated its Centennial. Enrollment reached 1,000 for the first time in 2009.

== Arts ==
The school has extensive programs in vocal and instrumental music, fine arts, and theater. The school offers extensive arts programming in during the summer season in partnership with the Handwork Studio.

== 2011 Sexual abuse ==
In 2011, a former Potomac student accused a former Intermediate School teacher and administrator of abusing her in the late 1960s. The accused individual was arrested by Fairfax County police in November 2012. He was convicted in October 2013 of molesting five girls and sentenced to 43 years in prison.

In addition to the police probe, The Potomac School initiated an independent investigation, which was completed in June 2014. The school announced that it would turn its findings over to Fairfax County police and would institute comprehensive training in abuse prevention, background checks of all employees and volunteers, and standardized practices for handling abuse complaints.

== Notable alumni ==
- Michael Arndt, screenwriter, Little Miss Sunshine
- Chris Ayer, solo guitar artist
- Rostam Batmanglij, rock musician, Vampire Weekend
- Zal Batmanglij, film director, The East
- Alice Louise Davison, linguist
- Sasha DiGiulian, rock climber
- Julie Finley, former ambassador to the Organization for Security and Co-operation in Europe
- Azzi Fudd, basketball player UConn Huskies women's basketball
- Davis Guggenheim, writer and director
- Sarah Meeker Jensen, architect
- Dwaune Jones, professional football coach, Atlanta Falcons
- Thomas Kean, politician and businessman
- Roger Kent, politician
- Nick Lowery, former professional football player, Kansas City Chiefs, New England Patriots, and New York Jets
- Robert McDowell, 2-time Federal Communications Commission (FCC) Commissioner
- Ellen McLaughlin, playwright
- Jon Metzger, vibraphonist
- Pierre Omidyar, founder of eBay and philanthropist with Omidyar Network
- Antonio de Oyarzabal, Spanish diplomat
- Adam Platt, New York magazine restaurant critic
- Keshia Knight Pulliam, actress best known for playing Rudy Huxtable on The Cosby Show
- Lee Radziwill, socialite
- Alex Ross, music critic for The New Yorker
- Janet Auchincloss Rutherfurd, socialite
- Frances Sternhagen, actor in television, theater, and film
- Whit Stillman, film director
- Nina Auchincloss Straight, author and socialite
- Bandar bin Sultan Al Saud, retired Saudi Arabian diplomat
- Derek Thompson, journalist, The Atlantic
- Russell E. Train, second administrator of the Environmental Protection Agency
